

569001–569100 

|-bgcolor=#fefefe
| 569001 ||  || — || March 8, 2005 || Mount Lemmon || Mount Lemmon Survey ||  || align=right data-sort-value="0.67" | 670 m || 
|-id=002 bgcolor=#fefefe
| 569002 ||  || — || March 4, 2005 || Kitt Peak || Spacewatch ||  || align=right data-sort-value="0.77" | 770 m || 
|-id=003 bgcolor=#E9E9E9
| 569003 ||  || — || March 12, 2005 || Kitt Peak || Spacewatch ||  || align=right | 1.7 km || 
|-id=004 bgcolor=#fefefe
| 569004 ||  || — || March 11, 2005 || Mount Lemmon || Mount Lemmon Survey ||  || align=right data-sort-value="0.81" | 810 m || 
|-id=005 bgcolor=#E9E9E9
| 569005 ||  || — || March 12, 2005 || Kitt Peak || Spacewatch ||  || align=right | 2.0 km || 
|-id=006 bgcolor=#fefefe
| 569006 ||  || — || March 13, 2005 || Kitt Peak || Spacewatch ||  || align=right data-sort-value="0.67" | 670 m || 
|-id=007 bgcolor=#fefefe
| 569007 ||  || — || March 9, 2005 || Anderson Mesa || LONEOS ||  || align=right data-sort-value="0.83" | 830 m || 
|-id=008 bgcolor=#d6d6d6
| 569008 ||  || — || March 11, 2005 || Kitt Peak || M. W. Buie, L. H. Wasserman ||  || align=right | 1.8 km || 
|-id=009 bgcolor=#d6d6d6
| 569009 ||  || — || March 11, 2005 || Kitt Peak || M. W. Buie, L. H. Wasserman ||  || align=right | 1.6 km || 
|-id=010 bgcolor=#fefefe
| 569010 ||  || — || March 8, 2005 || Mount Lemmon || Mount Lemmon Survey ||  || align=right data-sort-value="0.57" | 570 m || 
|-id=011 bgcolor=#d6d6d6
| 569011 ||  || — || March 10, 2005 || Mount Lemmon || Mount Lemmon Survey ||  || align=right | 2.2 km || 
|-id=012 bgcolor=#d6d6d6
| 569012 ||  || — || March 10, 2005 || Mount Lemmon || Mount Lemmon Survey ||  || align=right | 2.3 km || 
|-id=013 bgcolor=#E9E9E9
| 569013 ||  || — || March 11, 2005 || Mount Lemmon || Mount Lemmon Survey ||  || align=right | 2.2 km || 
|-id=014 bgcolor=#E9E9E9
| 569014 ||  || — || March 11, 2005 || Mount Lemmon || Mount Lemmon Survey ||  || align=right | 1.9 km || 
|-id=015 bgcolor=#E9E9E9
| 569015 ||  || — || January 29, 2014 || Kitt Peak || Spacewatch ||  || align=right | 1.5 km || 
|-id=016 bgcolor=#E9E9E9
| 569016 ||  || — || March 9, 2005 || Catalina || CSS ||  || align=right | 1.3 km || 
|-id=017 bgcolor=#E9E9E9
| 569017 ||  || — || March 10, 2005 || Mount Lemmon || Mount Lemmon Survey ||  || align=right | 1.9 km || 
|-id=018 bgcolor=#fefefe
| 569018 ||  || — || March 14, 2005 || Mount Lemmon || Mount Lemmon Survey ||  || align=right data-sort-value="0.69" | 690 m || 
|-id=019 bgcolor=#E9E9E9
| 569019 ||  || — || December 30, 2008 || Mount Lemmon || Mount Lemmon Survey ||  || align=right | 2.2 km || 
|-id=020 bgcolor=#E9E9E9
| 569020 ||  || — || December 1, 2008 || Kitt Peak || Spacewatch ||  || align=right | 1.9 km || 
|-id=021 bgcolor=#E9E9E9
| 569021 ||  || — || August 10, 2012 || Kitt Peak || Spacewatch ||  || align=right | 2.0 km || 
|-id=022 bgcolor=#E9E9E9
| 569022 ||  || — || December 11, 2013 || Mount Lemmon || Mount Lemmon Survey ||  || align=right | 2.0 km || 
|-id=023 bgcolor=#d6d6d6
| 569023 ||  || — || March 10, 2005 || Mount Lemmon || Mount Lemmon Survey ||  || align=right | 1.7 km || 
|-id=024 bgcolor=#fefefe
| 569024 ||  || — || February 7, 2008 || Mount Lemmon || Mount Lemmon Survey ||  || align=right data-sort-value="0.63" | 630 m || 
|-id=025 bgcolor=#E9E9E9
| 569025 ||  || — || March 11, 2005 || Mount Lemmon || Mount Lemmon Survey ||  || align=right | 1.5 km || 
|-id=026 bgcolor=#fefefe
| 569026 ||  || — || October 8, 2007 || Mount Lemmon || Mount Lemmon Survey ||  || align=right data-sort-value="0.57" | 570 m || 
|-id=027 bgcolor=#fefefe
| 569027 ||  || — || March 3, 2005 || Catalina || CSS ||  || align=right data-sort-value="0.71" | 710 m || 
|-id=028 bgcolor=#fefefe
| 569028 ||  || — || March 8, 2005 || Mount Lemmon || Mount Lemmon Survey ||  || align=right data-sort-value="0.67" | 670 m || 
|-id=029 bgcolor=#fefefe
| 569029 ||  || — || August 21, 2006 || Kitt Peak || Spacewatch ||  || align=right data-sort-value="0.59" | 590 m || 
|-id=030 bgcolor=#fefefe
| 569030 ||  || — || March 4, 2005 || Mount Lemmon || Mount Lemmon Survey ||  || align=right data-sort-value="0.59" | 590 m || 
|-id=031 bgcolor=#fefefe
| 569031 ||  || — || May 1, 2009 || Mount Lemmon || Mount Lemmon Survey ||  || align=right data-sort-value="0.61" | 610 m || 
|-id=032 bgcolor=#E9E9E9
| 569032 ||  || — || February 19, 2009 || Kitt Peak || Spacewatch ||  || align=right | 1.8 km || 
|-id=033 bgcolor=#E9E9E9
| 569033 ||  || — || February 7, 2013 || Kitt Peak || Spacewatch ||  || align=right | 1.0 km || 
|-id=034 bgcolor=#E9E9E9
| 569034 ||  || — || April 28, 2014 || Haleakala || Pan-STARRS ||  || align=right | 2.1 km || 
|-id=035 bgcolor=#d6d6d6
| 569035 ||  || — || March 8, 2005 || Mount Lemmon || Mount Lemmon Survey ||  || align=right | 1.7 km || 
|-id=036 bgcolor=#E9E9E9
| 569036 ||  || — || March 8, 2005 || Mount Lemmon || Mount Lemmon Survey ||  || align=right | 2.1 km || 
|-id=037 bgcolor=#d6d6d6
| 569037 ||  || — || March 17, 2012 || Mount Lemmon || Mount Lemmon Survey || 7:4 || align=right | 3.3 km || 
|-id=038 bgcolor=#d6d6d6
| 569038 ||  || — || February 17, 2010 || Kitt Peak || Spacewatch ||  || align=right | 1.8 km || 
|-id=039 bgcolor=#d6d6d6
| 569039 ||  || — || October 11, 2012 || Haleakala || Pan-STARRS ||  || align=right | 1.6 km || 
|-id=040 bgcolor=#d6d6d6
| 569040 ||  || — || February 27, 2015 || Haleakala || Pan-STARRS ||  || align=right | 1.7 km || 
|-id=041 bgcolor=#d6d6d6
| 569041 ||  || — || March 10, 2005 || Mount Lemmon || Mount Lemmon Survey ||  || align=right | 2.1 km || 
|-id=042 bgcolor=#d6d6d6
| 569042 ||  || — || March 9, 2005 || Mount Lemmon || Mount Lemmon Survey ||  || align=right | 1.7 km || 
|-id=043 bgcolor=#E9E9E9
| 569043 ||  || — || March 11, 2005 || Mount Lemmon || Mount Lemmon Survey ||  || align=right | 2.3 km || 
|-id=044 bgcolor=#d6d6d6
| 569044 ||  || — || March 18, 2005 || Catalina || CSS ||  || align=right | 1.9 km || 
|-id=045 bgcolor=#fefefe
| 569045 ||  || — || March 10, 2005 || Mount Lemmon || Mount Lemmon Survey ||  || align=right data-sort-value="0.71" | 710 m || 
|-id=046 bgcolor=#fefefe
| 569046 ||  || — || January 23, 2015 || Haleakala || Pan-STARRS ||  || align=right data-sort-value="0.57" | 570 m || 
|-id=047 bgcolor=#E9E9E9
| 569047 ||  || — || January 20, 2009 || Kitt Peak || Spacewatch ||  || align=right | 1.0 km || 
|-id=048 bgcolor=#E9E9E9
| 569048 ||  || — || May 22, 2015 || Haleakala || Pan-STARRS ||  || align=right | 1.7 km || 
|-id=049 bgcolor=#fefefe
| 569049 ||  || — || March 11, 2005 || Anderson Mesa || LONEOS ||  || align=right data-sort-value="0.85" | 850 m || 
|-id=050 bgcolor=#E9E9E9
| 569050 ||  || — || April 2, 2005 || Mount Lemmon || Mount Lemmon Survey ||  || align=right | 1.8 km || 
|-id=051 bgcolor=#d6d6d6
| 569051 ||  || — || April 2, 2005 || Mount Lemmon || Mount Lemmon Survey ||  || align=right | 2.1 km || 
|-id=052 bgcolor=#fefefe
| 569052 ||  || — || March 8, 2005 || Mount Lemmon || Mount Lemmon Survey ||  || align=right data-sort-value="0.81" | 810 m || 
|-id=053 bgcolor=#d6d6d6
| 569053 ||  || — || April 4, 2005 || Mount Lemmon || Mount Lemmon Survey ||  || align=right | 1.8 km || 
|-id=054 bgcolor=#fefefe
| 569054 ||  || — || April 7, 2005 || Kitt Peak || Spacewatch ||  || align=right data-sort-value="0.54" | 540 m || 
|-id=055 bgcolor=#E9E9E9
| 569055 ||  || — || April 7, 2005 || Mount Lemmon || Mount Lemmon Survey ||  || align=right | 1.7 km || 
|-id=056 bgcolor=#E9E9E9
| 569056 ||  || — || April 7, 2005 || Mount Lemmon || Mount Lemmon Survey ||  || align=right | 2.2 km || 
|-id=057 bgcolor=#d6d6d6
| 569057 ||  || — || April 7, 2005 || Kitt Peak || Spacewatch ||  || align=right | 2.3 km || 
|-id=058 bgcolor=#d6d6d6
| 569058 ||  || — || April 10, 2005 || Mount Lemmon || Mount Lemmon Survey ||  || align=right | 2.0 km || 
|-id=059 bgcolor=#fefefe
| 569059 ||  || — || March 12, 2005 || Kitt Peak || Spacewatch ||  || align=right data-sort-value="0.71" | 710 m || 
|-id=060 bgcolor=#fefefe
| 569060 ||  || — || March 13, 2005 || Kitt Peak || Spacewatch ||  || align=right data-sort-value="0.66" | 660 m || 
|-id=061 bgcolor=#fefefe
| 569061 ||  || — || April 7, 2005 || Kitt Peak || Spacewatch ||  || align=right data-sort-value="0.82" | 820 m || 
|-id=062 bgcolor=#d6d6d6
| 569062 ||  || — || February 14, 2009 || Kitt Peak || Spacewatch ||  || align=right | 1.8 km || 
|-id=063 bgcolor=#fefefe
| 569063 ||  || — || March 10, 2005 || Mount Lemmon || Mount Lemmon Survey ||  || align=right data-sort-value="0.79" | 790 m || 
|-id=064 bgcolor=#E9E9E9
| 569064 ||  || — || April 14, 2005 || Kitt Peak || Spacewatch || MRX || align=right | 1.1 km || 
|-id=065 bgcolor=#fefefe
| 569065 ||  || — || March 13, 2005 || Siding Spring || SSS ||  || align=right | 1.4 km || 
|-id=066 bgcolor=#d6d6d6
| 569066 ||  || — || April 10, 2005 || Kitt Peak || Kitt Peak Obs. ||  || align=right | 1.8 km || 
|-id=067 bgcolor=#fefefe
| 569067 ||  || — || April 10, 2005 || Kitt Peak || Kitt Peak Obs. ||  || align=right data-sort-value="0.52" | 520 m || 
|-id=068 bgcolor=#E9E9E9
| 569068 ||  || — || April 4, 2005 || Mount Lemmon || Mount Lemmon Survey ||  || align=right | 1.6 km || 
|-id=069 bgcolor=#d6d6d6
| 569069 ||  || — || April 10, 2005 || Kitt Peak || Kitt Peak Obs. ||  || align=right | 1.7 km || 
|-id=070 bgcolor=#fefefe
| 569070 ||  || — || April 4, 2005 || Mount Lemmon || Mount Lemmon Survey ||  || align=right data-sort-value="0.65" | 650 m || 
|-id=071 bgcolor=#fefefe
| 569071 ||  || — || April 16, 2005 || Kitt Peak || Spacewatch ||  || align=right data-sort-value="0.62" | 620 m || 
|-id=072 bgcolor=#fefefe
| 569072 ||  || — || March 17, 2005 || Mount Lemmon || Mount Lemmon Survey ||  || align=right data-sort-value="0.67" | 670 m || 
|-id=073 bgcolor=#fefefe
| 569073 ||  || — || March 14, 2005 || Mount Lemmon || Mount Lemmon Survey ||  || align=right data-sort-value="0.82" | 820 m || 
|-id=074 bgcolor=#fefefe
| 569074 ||  || — || April 11, 2005 || Kitt Peak || Spacewatch ||  || align=right data-sort-value="0.62" | 620 m || 
|-id=075 bgcolor=#E9E9E9
| 569075 ||  || — || March 8, 2005 || Mount Lemmon || Mount Lemmon Survey ||  || align=right | 1.6 km || 
|-id=076 bgcolor=#d6d6d6
| 569076 ||  || — || March 8, 2005 || Mount Lemmon || Mount Lemmon Survey ||  || align=right | 2.7 km || 
|-id=077 bgcolor=#d6d6d6
| 569077 ||  || — || October 15, 2007 || Mount Lemmon || Mount Lemmon Survey ||  || align=right | 2.1 km || 
|-id=078 bgcolor=#d6d6d6
| 569078 ||  || — || September 14, 2013 || Mount Lemmon || Mount Lemmon Survey ||  || align=right | 3.1 km || 
|-id=079 bgcolor=#d6d6d6
| 569079 ||  || — || March 17, 2015 || Haleakala || Pan-STARRS ||  || align=right | 1.9 km || 
|-id=080 bgcolor=#fefefe
| 569080 ||  || — || September 19, 1995 || Kitt Peak || Spacewatch ||  || align=right data-sort-value="0.64" | 640 m || 
|-id=081 bgcolor=#E9E9E9
| 569081 ||  || — || March 26, 2014 || Mount Lemmon || Mount Lemmon Survey ||  || align=right | 1.9 km || 
|-id=082 bgcolor=#FA8072
| 569082 ||  || — || April 6, 2005 || Mount Lemmon || Mount Lemmon Survey || H || align=right data-sort-value="0.43" | 430 m || 
|-id=083 bgcolor=#d6d6d6
| 569083 ||  || — || February 16, 2015 || Haleakala || Pan-STARRS ||  || align=right | 2.0 km || 
|-id=084 bgcolor=#fefefe
| 569084 ||  || — || January 18, 2016 || Haleakala || Pan-STARRS ||  || align=right data-sort-value="0.75" | 750 m || 
|-id=085 bgcolor=#E9E9E9
| 569085 ||  || — || July 19, 2015 || Haleakala || Pan-STARRS ||  || align=right | 1.8 km || 
|-id=086 bgcolor=#fefefe
| 569086 ||  || — || January 14, 2016 || Haleakala || Pan-STARRS ||  || align=right data-sort-value="0.83" | 830 m || 
|-id=087 bgcolor=#fefefe
| 569087 ||  || — || April 11, 2005 || Mount Lemmon || Mount Lemmon Survey ||  || align=right data-sort-value="0.71" | 710 m || 
|-id=088 bgcolor=#fefefe
| 569088 ||  || — || April 2, 2005 || Mount Lemmon || Mount Lemmon Survey ||  || align=right data-sort-value="0.67" | 670 m || 
|-id=089 bgcolor=#d6d6d6
| 569089 ||  || — || April 4, 2005 || Mount Lemmon || Mount Lemmon Survey ||  || align=right | 1.8 km || 
|-id=090 bgcolor=#E9E9E9
| 569090 ||  || — || April 30, 2005 || Kitt Peak || Spacewatch ||  || align=right | 2.2 km || 
|-id=091 bgcolor=#d6d6d6
| 569091 ||  || — || December 4, 2013 || Haleakala || Pan-STARRS ||  || align=right | 1.6 km || 
|-id=092 bgcolor=#fefefe
| 569092 ||  || — || April 16, 2005 || Kitt Peak || Spacewatch ||  || align=right data-sort-value="0.65" | 650 m || 
|-id=093 bgcolor=#fefefe
| 569093 ||  || — || April 30, 2005 || Campo Imperatore || CINEOS ||  || align=right data-sort-value="0.83" | 830 m || 
|-id=094 bgcolor=#d6d6d6
| 569094 ||  || — || May 4, 2005 || Mauna Kea || Mauna Kea Obs. ||  || align=right | 2.0 km || 
|-id=095 bgcolor=#fefefe
| 569095 ||  || — || April 7, 2005 || Kitt Peak || Spacewatch ||  || align=right data-sort-value="0.61" | 610 m || 
|-id=096 bgcolor=#d6d6d6
| 569096 ||  || — || May 4, 2005 || Mount Lemmon || Mount Lemmon Survey ||  || align=right | 2.5 km || 
|-id=097 bgcolor=#fefefe
| 569097 ||  || — || April 11, 2005 || Mount Lemmon || Mount Lemmon Survey ||  || align=right data-sort-value="0.79" | 790 m || 
|-id=098 bgcolor=#fefefe
| 569098 ||  || — || May 8, 2005 || Mount Lemmon || Mount Lemmon Survey ||  || align=right data-sort-value="0.81" | 810 m || 
|-id=099 bgcolor=#E9E9E9
| 569099 ||  || — || May 4, 2005 || Kitt Peak || Spacewatch ||  || align=right | 2.2 km || 
|-id=100 bgcolor=#E9E9E9
| 569100 ||  || — || May 8, 2005 || Kitt Peak || Spacewatch ||  || align=right | 1.9 km || 
|}

569101–569200 

|-bgcolor=#fefefe
| 569101 ||  || — || May 4, 2005 || Kitt Peak || Kitt Peak Obs. || H || align=right data-sort-value="0.68" | 680 m || 
|-id=102 bgcolor=#fefefe
| 569102 ||  || — || May 4, 2005 || Kitt Peak || Kitt Peak Obs. || H || align=right data-sort-value="0.65" | 650 m || 
|-id=103 bgcolor=#d6d6d6
| 569103 ||  || — || May 8, 2005 || Kitt Peak || Spacewatch ||  || align=right | 2.2 km || 
|-id=104 bgcolor=#fefefe
| 569104 ||  || — || May 10, 2005 || Mount Lemmon || Mount Lemmon Survey ||  || align=right data-sort-value="0.72" | 720 m || 
|-id=105 bgcolor=#d6d6d6
| 569105 ||  || — || February 1, 2009 || Mount Lemmon || Mount Lemmon Survey ||  || align=right | 2.3 km || 
|-id=106 bgcolor=#fefefe
| 569106 ||  || — || May 10, 2005 || Mount Lemmon || Mount Lemmon Survey ||  || align=right data-sort-value="0.89" | 890 m || 
|-id=107 bgcolor=#d6d6d6
| 569107 ||  || — || May 13, 2005 || Kitt Peak || Spacewatch || 3:2 || align=right | 3.5 km || 
|-id=108 bgcolor=#fefefe
| 569108 ||  || — || April 16, 2005 || Kitt Peak || Spacewatch ||  || align=right data-sort-value="0.75" | 750 m || 
|-id=109 bgcolor=#d6d6d6
| 569109 ||  || — || May 13, 2005 || Kitt Peak || Spacewatch ||  || align=right | 2.3 km || 
|-id=110 bgcolor=#fefefe
| 569110 ||  || — || May 13, 2005 || Kitt Peak || Spacewatch ||  || align=right data-sort-value="0.97" | 970 m || 
|-id=111 bgcolor=#fefefe
| 569111 ||  || — || March 17, 2005 || Catalina || CSS ||  || align=right data-sort-value="0.94" | 940 m || 
|-id=112 bgcolor=#d6d6d6
| 569112 ||  || — || May 4, 2005 || Kitt Peak || Spacewatch ||  || align=right | 2.6 km || 
|-id=113 bgcolor=#fefefe
| 569113 ||  || — || May 7, 2005 || Kitt Peak || Spacewatch ||  || align=right data-sort-value="0.77" | 770 m || 
|-id=114 bgcolor=#d6d6d6
| 569114 ||  || — || April 11, 2005 || Mount Lemmon || Mount Lemmon Survey ||  || align=right | 1.9 km || 
|-id=115 bgcolor=#fefefe
| 569115 ||  || — || May 7, 2005 || Mount Lemmon || Mount Lemmon Survey ||  || align=right data-sort-value="0.71" | 710 m || 
|-id=116 bgcolor=#d6d6d6
| 569116 ||  || — || August 4, 2011 || Haleakala || Pan-STARRS ||  || align=right | 3.5 km || 
|-id=117 bgcolor=#fefefe
| 569117 ||  || — || February 15, 2016 || Mount Lemmon || Mount Lemmon Survey ||  || align=right data-sort-value="0.74" | 740 m || 
|-id=118 bgcolor=#fefefe
| 569118 ||  || — || August 12, 2013 || Kitt Peak || Spacewatch ||  || align=right data-sort-value="0.61" | 610 m || 
|-id=119 bgcolor=#fefefe
| 569119 ||  || — || June 20, 2013 || Haleakala || Pan-STARRS ||  || align=right data-sort-value="0.65" | 650 m || 
|-id=120 bgcolor=#E9E9E9
| 569120 ||  || — || May 14, 2005 || Mount Lemmon || Mount Lemmon Survey ||  || align=right | 2.4 km || 
|-id=121 bgcolor=#d6d6d6
| 569121 ||  || — || December 5, 2010 || Kitt Peak || Spacewatch || 3:2 || align=right | 3.6 km || 
|-id=122 bgcolor=#d6d6d6
| 569122 ||  || — || October 21, 2012 || Mount Lemmon || Mount Lemmon Survey ||  || align=right | 2.1 km || 
|-id=123 bgcolor=#d6d6d6
| 569123 ||  || — || October 8, 2012 || Mount Lemmon || Mount Lemmon Survey ||  || align=right | 2.0 km || 
|-id=124 bgcolor=#fefefe
| 569124 ||  || — || March 28, 2008 || Mount Lemmon || Mount Lemmon Survey ||  || align=right data-sort-value="0.50" | 500 m || 
|-id=125 bgcolor=#E9E9E9
| 569125 ||  || — || April 4, 2014 || Haleakala || Pan-STARRS ||  || align=right | 1.8 km || 
|-id=126 bgcolor=#E9E9E9
| 569126 ||  || — || May 3, 2005 || Kitt Peak || Spacewatch ||  || align=right | 1.1 km || 
|-id=127 bgcolor=#E9E9E9
| 569127 ||  || — || May 20, 2005 || Mount Lemmon || Mount Lemmon Survey ||  || align=right | 1.9 km || 
|-id=128 bgcolor=#E9E9E9
| 569128 ||  || — || June 3, 2005 || Kitt Peak || Spacewatch ||  || align=right | 1.6 km || 
|-id=129 bgcolor=#d6d6d6
| 569129 ||  || — || June 4, 2005 || Kitt Peak || Spacewatch ||  || align=right | 2.5 km || 
|-id=130 bgcolor=#fefefe
| 569130 ||  || — || May 8, 2005 || Mount Lemmon || Mount Lemmon Survey ||  || align=right data-sort-value="0.81" | 810 m || 
|-id=131 bgcolor=#d6d6d6
| 569131 ||  || — || June 11, 2005 || Kitt Peak || Spacewatch ||  || align=right | 2.6 km || 
|-id=132 bgcolor=#d6d6d6
| 569132 ||  || — || June 12, 2005 || Kitt Peak || Spacewatch ||  || align=right | 2.7 km || 
|-id=133 bgcolor=#fefefe
| 569133 ||  || — || June 8, 2005 || Kitt Peak || Spacewatch ||  || align=right data-sort-value="0.47" | 470 m || 
|-id=134 bgcolor=#E9E9E9
| 569134 ||  || — || June 15, 2005 || Mount Lemmon || Mount Lemmon Survey ||  || align=right data-sort-value="0.87" | 870 m || 
|-id=135 bgcolor=#fefefe
| 569135 ||  || — || March 21, 2015 || Haleakala || Pan-STARRS ||  || align=right data-sort-value="0.82" | 820 m || 
|-id=136 bgcolor=#d6d6d6
| 569136 ||  || — || July 31, 2016 || Haleakala || Pan-STARRS ||  || align=right | 2.7 km || 
|-id=137 bgcolor=#E9E9E9
| 569137 ||  || — || December 13, 2006 || Mount Lemmon || Mount Lemmon Survey ||  || align=right | 1.2 km || 
|-id=138 bgcolor=#E9E9E9
| 569138 ||  || — || May 16, 2005 || Mount Lemmon || Mount Lemmon Survey ||  || align=right | 2.0 km || 
|-id=139 bgcolor=#fefefe
| 569139 ||  || — || June 1, 2005 || Kitt Peak || Spacewatch ||  || align=right data-sort-value="0.59" | 590 m || 
|-id=140 bgcolor=#E9E9E9
| 569140 ||  || — || March 19, 2009 || Kitt Peak || Spacewatch ||  || align=right | 1.8 km || 
|-id=141 bgcolor=#d6d6d6
| 569141 ||  || — || June 14, 2005 || Mount Lemmon || Mount Lemmon Survey ||  || align=right | 2.8 km || 
|-id=142 bgcolor=#FA8072
| 569142 ||  || — || June 4, 2005 || Socorro || LINEAR ||  || align=right data-sort-value="0.60" | 600 m || 
|-id=143 bgcolor=#d6d6d6
| 569143 ||  || — || May 20, 2005 || Mount Lemmon || Mount Lemmon Survey ||  || align=right | 3.0 km || 
|-id=144 bgcolor=#fefefe
| 569144 ||  || — || June 29, 2005 || Kitt Peak || Spacewatch ||  || align=right data-sort-value="0.78" | 780 m || 
|-id=145 bgcolor=#fefefe
| 569145 ||  || — || June 29, 2005 || Palomar || NEAT || H || align=right data-sort-value="0.97" | 970 m || 
|-id=146 bgcolor=#E9E9E9
| 569146 ||  || — || June 29, 2005 || Kitt Peak || Spacewatch ||  || align=right data-sort-value="0.97" | 970 m || 
|-id=147 bgcolor=#fefefe
| 569147 ||  || — || June 30, 2005 || Kitt Peak || Spacewatch ||  || align=right data-sort-value="0.60" | 600 m || 
|-id=148 bgcolor=#fefefe
| 569148 ||  || — || June 30, 2005 || Kitt Peak || Spacewatch ||  || align=right data-sort-value="0.62" | 620 m || 
|-id=149 bgcolor=#d6d6d6
| 569149 ||  || — || July 1, 2005 || Kitt Peak || Spacewatch ||  || align=right | 2.4 km || 
|-id=150 bgcolor=#fefefe
| 569150 ||  || — || July 2, 2005 || Kitt Peak || Spacewatch ||  || align=right data-sort-value="0.94" | 940 m || 
|-id=151 bgcolor=#E9E9E9
| 569151 ||  || — || July 14, 2001 || Palomar || NEAT ||  || align=right | 1.2 km || 
|-id=152 bgcolor=#d6d6d6
| 569152 ||  || — || July 4, 2005 || Mount Lemmon || Mount Lemmon Survey ||  || align=right | 3.5 km || 
|-id=153 bgcolor=#d6d6d6
| 569153 ||  || — || July 6, 2005 || Kitt Peak || Spacewatch ||  || align=right | 2.3 km || 
|-id=154 bgcolor=#fefefe
| 569154 ||  || — || July 6, 2005 || Kitt Peak || Spacewatch ||  || align=right data-sort-value="0.54" | 540 m || 
|-id=155 bgcolor=#fefefe
| 569155 ||  || — || July 3, 2005 || Mount Lemmon || Mount Lemmon Survey ||  || align=right data-sort-value="0.58" | 580 m || 
|-id=156 bgcolor=#E9E9E9
| 569156 ||  || — || July 6, 2005 || Kitt Peak || Spacewatch ||  || align=right | 1.3 km || 
|-id=157 bgcolor=#d6d6d6
| 569157 ||  || — || July 7, 2005 || Kitt Peak || Spacewatch ||  || align=right | 2.8 km || 
|-id=158 bgcolor=#d6d6d6
| 569158 ||  || — || July 5, 2005 || Kitt Peak || Spacewatch ||  || align=right | 2.6 km || 
|-id=159 bgcolor=#d6d6d6
| 569159 ||  || — || June 18, 2005 || Mount Lemmon || Mount Lemmon Survey ||  || align=right | 2.0 km || 
|-id=160 bgcolor=#d6d6d6
| 569160 ||  || — || July 2, 2005 || Kitt Peak || Spacewatch ||  || align=right | 2.7 km || 
|-id=161 bgcolor=#fefefe
| 569161 ||  || — || July 3, 2005 || Mount Lemmon || Mount Lemmon Survey ||  || align=right data-sort-value="0.56" | 560 m || 
|-id=162 bgcolor=#fefefe
| 569162 ||  || — || July 5, 2005 || Mount Lemmon || Mount Lemmon Survey ||  || align=right data-sort-value="0.54" | 540 m || 
|-id=163 bgcolor=#d6d6d6
| 569163 ||  || — || July 9, 2005 || Kitt Peak || Spacewatch ||  || align=right | 2.5 km || 
|-id=164 bgcolor=#d6d6d6
| 569164 ||  || — || July 12, 2005 || Mount Lemmon || Mount Lemmon Survey ||  || align=right | 2.1 km || 
|-id=165 bgcolor=#d6d6d6
| 569165 ||  || — || July 12, 2005 || Mount Lemmon || Mount Lemmon Survey ||  || align=right | 2.8 km || 
|-id=166 bgcolor=#E9E9E9
| 569166 ||  || — || June 14, 2005 || Mount Lemmon || Mount Lemmon Survey ||  || align=right data-sort-value="0.85" | 850 m || 
|-id=167 bgcolor=#d6d6d6
| 569167 ||  || — || July 5, 2005 || Kitt Peak || Spacewatch ||  || align=right | 2.3 km || 
|-id=168 bgcolor=#d6d6d6
| 569168 ||  || — || July 6, 2005 || Kitt Peak || Spacewatch ||  || align=right | 1.7 km || 
|-id=169 bgcolor=#E9E9E9
| 569169 ||  || — || July 7, 2005 || Kitt Peak || Spacewatch ||  || align=right data-sort-value="0.73" | 730 m || 
|-id=170 bgcolor=#fefefe
| 569170 ||  || — || July 12, 2005 || Mount Lemmon || Mount Lemmon Survey ||  || align=right data-sort-value="0.62" | 620 m || 
|-id=171 bgcolor=#d6d6d6
| 569171 ||  || — || July 7, 2005 || Mauna Kea || Mauna Kea Obs. ||  || align=right | 3.7 km || 
|-id=172 bgcolor=#d6d6d6
| 569172 ||  || — || July 7, 2005 || Mauna Kea || Mauna Kea Obs. ||  || align=right | 2.4 km || 
|-id=173 bgcolor=#d6d6d6
| 569173 ||  || — || July 7, 2005 || Mauna Kea || Mauna Kea Obs. ||  || align=right | 2.1 km || 
|-id=174 bgcolor=#d6d6d6
| 569174 ||  || — || July 15, 2005 || Mount Lemmon || Mount Lemmon Survey ||  || align=right | 2.0 km || 
|-id=175 bgcolor=#fefefe
| 569175 ||  || — || July 7, 2005 || Mauna Kea || Mauna Kea Obs. ||  || align=right data-sort-value="0.47" | 470 m || 
|-id=176 bgcolor=#fefefe
| 569176 ||  || — || February 12, 2008 || Mount Lemmon || Mount Lemmon Survey ||  || align=right data-sort-value="0.82" | 820 m || 
|-id=177 bgcolor=#E9E9E9
| 569177 ||  || — || June 18, 2014 || Haleakala || Pan-STARRS ||  || align=right | 2.2 km || 
|-id=178 bgcolor=#d6d6d6
| 569178 ||  || — || December 17, 2007 || Kitt Peak || Spacewatch ||  || align=right | 2.8 km || 
|-id=179 bgcolor=#d6d6d6
| 569179 ||  || — || December 31, 2007 || Mount Lemmon || Mount Lemmon Survey ||  || align=right | 2.8 km || 
|-id=180 bgcolor=#d6d6d6
| 569180 ||  || — || January 15, 2008 || Mount Lemmon || Mount Lemmon Survey ||  || align=right | 3.1 km || 
|-id=181 bgcolor=#E9E9E9
| 569181 ||  || — || December 21, 2014 || Haleakala || Pan-STARRS ||  || align=right data-sort-value="0.76" | 760 m || 
|-id=182 bgcolor=#d6d6d6
| 569182 ||  || — || December 31, 2007 || Kitt Peak || Spacewatch ||  || align=right | 2.6 km || 
|-id=183 bgcolor=#d6d6d6
| 569183 ||  || — || August 30, 2016 || Haleakala || Pan-STARRS ||  || align=right | 2.7 km || 
|-id=184 bgcolor=#d6d6d6
| 569184 ||  || — || July 9, 2005 || Kitt Peak || Spacewatch ||  || align=right | 2.0 km || 
|-id=185 bgcolor=#E9E9E9
| 569185 ||  || — || January 19, 2012 || Haleakala || Pan-STARRS ||  || align=right data-sort-value="0.75" | 750 m || 
|-id=186 bgcolor=#d6d6d6
| 569186 ||  || — || July 23, 2015 || Haleakala || Pan-STARRS ||  || align=right | 1.8 km || 
|-id=187 bgcolor=#E9E9E9
| 569187 ||  || — || July 29, 2005 || Palomar || NEAT ||  || align=right | 1.1 km || 
|-id=188 bgcolor=#E9E9E9
| 569188 ||  || — || July 30, 2005 || Palomar || NEAT ||  || align=right | 1.0 km || 
|-id=189 bgcolor=#d6d6d6
| 569189 ||  || — || July 30, 2005 || Palomar || NEAT ||  || align=right | 2.0 km || 
|-id=190 bgcolor=#fefefe
| 569190 ||  || — || July 29, 2005 || Palomar || NEAT ||  || align=right | 1.1 km || 
|-id=191 bgcolor=#d6d6d6
| 569191 ||  || — || July 29, 2005 || Palomar || NEAT ||  || align=right | 2.6 km || 
|-id=192 bgcolor=#d6d6d6
| 569192 ||  || — || November 23, 2006 || Kitt Peak || Spacewatch ||  || align=right | 2.7 km || 
|-id=193 bgcolor=#d6d6d6
| 569193 ||  || — || July 30, 2005 || Palomar || NEAT || Tj (2.99) || align=right | 3.4 km || 
|-id=194 bgcolor=#d6d6d6
| 569194 ||  || — || August 4, 2005 || Palomar || NEAT ||  || align=right | 2.7 km || 
|-id=195 bgcolor=#d6d6d6
| 569195 ||  || — || August 4, 2005 || Palomar || NEAT ||  || align=right | 2.1 km || 
|-id=196 bgcolor=#d6d6d6
| 569196 ||  || — || August 10, 2005 || Mauna Kea || Mauna Kea Obs. ||  || align=right | 2.1 km || 
|-id=197 bgcolor=#d6d6d6
| 569197 ||  || — || August 4, 2005 || Palomar || NEAT ||  || align=right | 2.9 km || 
|-id=198 bgcolor=#d6d6d6
| 569198 ||  || — || October 17, 2006 || Kitt Peak || Spacewatch ||  || align=right | 2.3 km || 
|-id=199 bgcolor=#E9E9E9
| 569199 ||  || — || March 13, 2008 || Kitt Peak || Spacewatch ||  || align=right data-sort-value="0.60" | 600 m || 
|-id=200 bgcolor=#fefefe
| 569200 ||  || — || August 6, 2005 || Palomar || NEAT ||  || align=right data-sort-value="0.47" | 470 m || 
|}

569201–569300 

|-bgcolor=#fefefe
| 569201 ||  || — || August 6, 2005 || Palomar || NEAT ||  || align=right data-sort-value="0.53" | 530 m || 
|-id=202 bgcolor=#fefefe
| 569202 ||  || — || March 26, 2008 || Mount Lemmon || Mount Lemmon Survey ||  || align=right data-sort-value="0.65" | 650 m || 
|-id=203 bgcolor=#fefefe
| 569203 ||  || — || August 3, 2016 || Haleakala || Pan-STARRS ||  || align=right data-sort-value="0.68" | 680 m || 
|-id=204 bgcolor=#E9E9E9
| 569204 ||  || — || August 8, 2005 || Cerro Tololo || Cerro Tololo Obs. ||  || align=right | 1.1 km || 
|-id=205 bgcolor=#E9E9E9
| 569205 ||  || — || August 8, 2005 || Cerro Tololo || Cerro Tololo Obs. ||  || align=right data-sort-value="0.70" | 700 m || 
|-id=206 bgcolor=#E9E9E9
| 569206 ||  || — || August 9, 2005 || Cerro Tololo || Cerro Tololo Obs. ||  || align=right | 1.5 km || 
|-id=207 bgcolor=#E9E9E9
| 569207 ||  || — || August 25, 2005 || Campo Imperatore || A. Boattini ||  || align=right | 1.1 km || 
|-id=208 bgcolor=#fefefe
| 569208 ||  || — || July 30, 2005 || Palomar || NEAT ||  || align=right data-sort-value="0.65" | 650 m || 
|-id=209 bgcolor=#d6d6d6
| 569209 ||  || — || August 6, 2005 || Palomar || NEAT ||  || align=right | 3.1 km || 
|-id=210 bgcolor=#fefefe
| 569210 ||  || — || August 25, 2005 || Palomar || NEAT ||  || align=right data-sort-value="0.71" | 710 m || 
|-id=211 bgcolor=#d6d6d6
| 569211 ||  || — || July 29, 2005 || Palomar || NEAT ||  || align=right | 2.7 km || 
|-id=212 bgcolor=#d6d6d6
| 569212 ||  || — || August 27, 2005 || Kitt Peak || Spacewatch ||  || align=right | 2.8 km || 
|-id=213 bgcolor=#fefefe
| 569213 ||  || — || August 28, 2005 || St. Veran || Saint-Véran Obs. ||  || align=right data-sort-value="0.67" | 670 m || 
|-id=214 bgcolor=#d6d6d6
| 569214 ||  || — || August 28, 2005 || St. Veran || Saint-Véran Obs. ||  || align=right | 2.5 km || 
|-id=215 bgcolor=#d6d6d6
| 569215 ||  || — || July 31, 2005 || Palomar || NEAT || Tj (2.89) || align=right | 3.9 km || 
|-id=216 bgcolor=#d6d6d6
| 569216 ||  || — || August 25, 2005 || Palomar || NEAT ||  || align=right | 3.1 km || 
|-id=217 bgcolor=#d6d6d6
| 569217 ||  || — || August 28, 2005 || Kitt Peak || Spacewatch ||  || align=right | 2.7 km || 
|-id=218 bgcolor=#FA8072
| 569218 ||  || — || July 30, 2005 || Palomar || NEAT ||  || align=right data-sort-value="0.67" | 670 m || 
|-id=219 bgcolor=#fefefe
| 569219 ||  || — || August 28, 2005 || Kitt Peak || Spacewatch ||  || align=right data-sort-value="0.48" | 480 m || 
|-id=220 bgcolor=#d6d6d6
| 569220 ||  || — || March 8, 2003 || Kitt Peak || Spacewatch ||  || align=right | 2.9 km || 
|-id=221 bgcolor=#E9E9E9
| 569221 ||  || — || August 28, 2005 || Kitt Peak || Spacewatch ||  || align=right data-sort-value="0.91" | 910 m || 
|-id=222 bgcolor=#E9E9E9
| 569222 ||  || — || August 29, 2005 || Vail-Jarnac || Jarnac Obs. ||  || align=right data-sort-value="0.73" | 730 m || 
|-id=223 bgcolor=#FA8072
| 569223 ||  || — || August 25, 2005 || Palomar || NEAT ||  || align=right data-sort-value="0.55" | 550 m || 
|-id=224 bgcolor=#d6d6d6
| 569224 ||  || — || August 26, 2005 || Palomar || NEAT ||  || align=right | 1.7 km || 
|-id=225 bgcolor=#d6d6d6
| 569225 ||  || — || August 26, 2005 || Palomar || NEAT ||  || align=right | 2.5 km || 
|-id=226 bgcolor=#E9E9E9
| 569226 ||  || — || August 26, 2005 || Palomar || NEAT ||  || align=right | 1.3 km || 
|-id=227 bgcolor=#fefefe
| 569227 ||  || — || August 25, 2005 || Palomar || NEAT ||  || align=right data-sort-value="0.60" | 600 m || 
|-id=228 bgcolor=#fefefe
| 569228 ||  || — || August 25, 2005 || Palomar || NEAT || H || align=right data-sort-value="0.59" | 590 m || 
|-id=229 bgcolor=#d6d6d6
| 569229 ||  || — || August 30, 2005 || Kitt Peak || Spacewatch ||  || align=right | 2.3 km || 
|-id=230 bgcolor=#fefefe
| 569230 ||  || — || August 25, 2005 || Palomar || NEAT ||  || align=right data-sort-value="0.78" | 780 m || 
|-id=231 bgcolor=#d6d6d6
| 569231 ||  || — || August 26, 2005 || Palomar || NEAT ||  || align=right | 2.6 km || 
|-id=232 bgcolor=#fefefe
| 569232 ||  || — || August 6, 2005 || Palomar || NEAT ||  || align=right data-sort-value="0.62" | 620 m || 
|-id=233 bgcolor=#E9E9E9
| 569233 ||  || — || July 30, 2005 || Palomar || NEAT ||  || align=right | 1.3 km || 
|-id=234 bgcolor=#d6d6d6
| 569234 ||  || — || August 31, 2005 || Kitt Peak || Spacewatch ||  || align=right | 2.9 km || 
|-id=235 bgcolor=#d6d6d6
| 569235 ||  || — || July 30, 2005 || Palomar || NEAT || SHU3:2 || align=right | 5.0 km || 
|-id=236 bgcolor=#d6d6d6
| 569236 ||  || — || August 31, 2005 || Kitt Peak || Spacewatch ||  || align=right | 3.6 km || 
|-id=237 bgcolor=#d6d6d6
| 569237 ||  || — || August 31, 2005 || Kitt Peak || Spacewatch ||  || align=right | 2.2 km || 
|-id=238 bgcolor=#fefefe
| 569238 ||  || — || August 31, 2005 || Kitt Peak || Spacewatch ||  || align=right data-sort-value="0.58" | 580 m || 
|-id=239 bgcolor=#d6d6d6
| 569239 ||  || — || April 23, 2004 || Kitt Peak || Spacewatch ||  || align=right | 3.0 km || 
|-id=240 bgcolor=#fefefe
| 569240 ||  || — || August 28, 2005 || Kitt Peak || Spacewatch ||  || align=right data-sort-value="0.70" | 700 m || 
|-id=241 bgcolor=#d6d6d6
| 569241 ||  || — || August 28, 2005 || Kitt Peak || Spacewatch ||  || align=right | 2.0 km || 
|-id=242 bgcolor=#E9E9E9
| 569242 ||  || — || August 28, 2005 || Kitt Peak || Spacewatch ||  || align=right | 1.2 km || 
|-id=243 bgcolor=#d6d6d6
| 569243 ||  || — || August 28, 2005 || Kitt Peak || Spacewatch ||  || align=right | 2.5 km || 
|-id=244 bgcolor=#E9E9E9
| 569244 ||  || — || August 28, 2005 || Kitt Peak || Spacewatch ||  || align=right | 1.1 km || 
|-id=245 bgcolor=#d6d6d6
| 569245 ||  || — || August 28, 2005 || Kitt Peak || Spacewatch ||  || align=right | 2.1 km || 
|-id=246 bgcolor=#fefefe
| 569246 ||  || — || August 30, 2005 || Kitt Peak || Spacewatch ||  || align=right data-sort-value="0.68" | 680 m || 
|-id=247 bgcolor=#E9E9E9
| 569247 ||  || — || August 30, 2005 || Kitt Peak || Spacewatch ||  || align=right data-sort-value="0.87" | 870 m || 
|-id=248 bgcolor=#d6d6d6
| 569248 ||  || — || August 27, 2005 || Palomar || NEAT ||  || align=right | 3.6 km || 
|-id=249 bgcolor=#d6d6d6
| 569249 ||  || — || July 26, 2005 || Palomar || NEAT || 3:2 || align=right | 5.9 km || 
|-id=250 bgcolor=#fefefe
| 569250 ||  || — || July 12, 2005 || Mount Lemmon || Mount Lemmon Survey ||  || align=right data-sort-value="0.69" | 690 m || 
|-id=251 bgcolor=#d6d6d6
| 569251 ||  || — || July 29, 2005 || Palomar || NEAT ||  || align=right | 2.6 km || 
|-id=252 bgcolor=#d6d6d6
| 569252 ||  || — || August 25, 2005 || Palomar || NEAT ||  || align=right | 2.7 km || 
|-id=253 bgcolor=#d6d6d6
| 569253 ||  || — || August 26, 2005 || Palomar || NEAT ||  || align=right | 2.7 km || 
|-id=254 bgcolor=#fefefe
| 569254 ||  || — || August 28, 2005 || Kitt Peak || Spacewatch ||  || align=right data-sort-value="0.71" | 710 m || 
|-id=255 bgcolor=#d6d6d6
| 569255 ||  || — || August 30, 2005 || Palomar || NEAT ||  || align=right | 3.0 km || 
|-id=256 bgcolor=#d6d6d6
| 569256 ||  || — || February 8, 2008 || Mount Lemmon || Mount Lemmon Survey ||  || align=right | 2.2 km || 
|-id=257 bgcolor=#d6d6d6
| 569257 ||  || — || August 31, 2005 || Palomar || NEAT ||  || align=right | 2.7 km || 
|-id=258 bgcolor=#d6d6d6
| 569258 ||  || — || August 30, 2005 || Palomar || NEAT ||  || align=right | 3.8 km || 
|-id=259 bgcolor=#d6d6d6
| 569259 ||  || — || December 25, 2006 || Catalina || CSS ||  || align=right | 3.4 km || 
|-id=260 bgcolor=#d6d6d6
| 569260 ||  || — || August 27, 2005 || Palomar || NEAT ||  || align=right | 3.1 km || 
|-id=261 bgcolor=#fefefe
| 569261 ||  || — || August 31, 2005 || Kitt Peak || Spacewatch ||  || align=right data-sort-value="0.60" | 600 m || 
|-id=262 bgcolor=#fefefe
| 569262 ||  || — || August 31, 2005 || Kitt Peak || Spacewatch ||  || align=right data-sort-value="0.54" | 540 m || 
|-id=263 bgcolor=#d6d6d6
| 569263 ||  || — || July 9, 2011 || Haleakala || Pan-STARRS ||  || align=right | 2.9 km || 
|-id=264 bgcolor=#d6d6d6
| 569264 ||  || — || August 30, 2005 || Palomar || NEAT ||  || align=right | 3.2 km || 
|-id=265 bgcolor=#d6d6d6
| 569265 ||  || — || November 22, 2006 || Catalina || CSS ||  || align=right | 3.5 km || 
|-id=266 bgcolor=#d6d6d6
| 569266 ||  || — || August 25, 2005 || Palomar || NEAT ||  || align=right | 3.5 km || 
|-id=267 bgcolor=#fefefe
| 569267 ||  || — || May 8, 2008 || Kitt Peak || Spacewatch ||  || align=right data-sort-value="0.82" | 820 m || 
|-id=268 bgcolor=#E9E9E9
| 569268 ||  || — || August 30, 2005 || Kitt Peak || Spacewatch ||  || align=right data-sort-value="0.80" | 800 m || 
|-id=269 bgcolor=#d6d6d6
| 569269 ||  || — || October 20, 2011 || Mount Lemmon || Mount Lemmon Survey ||  || align=right | 2.4 km || 
|-id=270 bgcolor=#d6d6d6
| 569270 ||  || — || February 28, 2008 || Mount Lemmon || Mount Lemmon Survey ||  || align=right | 2.5 km || 
|-id=271 bgcolor=#E9E9E9
| 569271 ||  || — || April 10, 2016 || Haleakala || Pan-STARRS ||  || align=right data-sort-value="0.95" | 950 m || 
|-id=272 bgcolor=#fefefe
| 569272 ||  || — || August 31, 2005 || Kitt Peak || Spacewatch ||  || align=right data-sort-value="0.59" | 590 m || 
|-id=273 bgcolor=#d6d6d6
| 569273 ||  || — || January 10, 2013 || Haleakala || Pan-STARRS ||  || align=right | 2.7 km || 
|-id=274 bgcolor=#fefefe
| 569274 ||  || — || December 9, 2012 || Haleakala || Pan-STARRS ||  || align=right data-sort-value="0.55" | 550 m || 
|-id=275 bgcolor=#fefefe
| 569275 ||  || — || September 17, 2012 || Kitt Peak || Spacewatch ||  || align=right data-sort-value="0.54" | 540 m || 
|-id=276 bgcolor=#E9E9E9
| 569276 ||  || — || August 29, 2005 || Kitt Peak || Spacewatch ||  || align=right | 1.4 km || 
|-id=277 bgcolor=#fefefe
| 569277 ||  || — || August 27, 2005 || Palomar || NEAT ||  || align=right data-sort-value="0.55" | 550 m || 
|-id=278 bgcolor=#fefefe
| 569278 ||  || — || December 17, 2009 || Mount Lemmon || Mount Lemmon Survey ||  || align=right data-sort-value="0.59" | 590 m || 
|-id=279 bgcolor=#d6d6d6
| 569279 ||  || — || August 31, 2005 || Kitt Peak || Spacewatch ||  || align=right | 2.5 km || 
|-id=280 bgcolor=#E9E9E9
| 569280 ||  || — || August 30, 2005 || Kitt Peak || Spacewatch ||  || align=right | 1.2 km || 
|-id=281 bgcolor=#d6d6d6
| 569281 ||  || — || August 28, 2005 || Kitt Peak || Spacewatch ||  || align=right | 2.4 km || 
|-id=282 bgcolor=#d6d6d6
| 569282 ||  || — || August 28, 2005 || Kitt Peak || Spacewatch ||  || align=right | 2.2 km || 
|-id=283 bgcolor=#fefefe
| 569283 ||  || — || August 29, 2005 || Kitt Peak || Spacewatch ||  || align=right data-sort-value="0.60" | 600 m || 
|-id=284 bgcolor=#d6d6d6
| 569284 ||  || — || August 31, 2005 || Kitt Peak || Spacewatch ||  || align=right | 2.1 km || 
|-id=285 bgcolor=#d6d6d6
| 569285 ||  || — || August 31, 2005 || Kitt Peak || Spacewatch ||  || align=right | 2.3 km || 
|-id=286 bgcolor=#d6d6d6
| 569286 ||  || — || August 30, 2005 || Kitt Peak || Spacewatch ||  || align=right | 1.8 km || 
|-id=287 bgcolor=#fefefe
| 569287 ||  || — || August 30, 2005 || Kitt Peak || Spacewatch ||  || align=right data-sort-value="0.59" | 590 m || 
|-id=288 bgcolor=#d6d6d6
| 569288 ||  || — || September 3, 2005 || Bergisch Gladbach || W. Bickel || EOS || align=right | 2.8 km || 
|-id=289 bgcolor=#d6d6d6
| 569289 ||  || — || August 27, 2005 || Palomar || NEAT ||  || align=right | 2.9 km || 
|-id=290 bgcolor=#d6d6d6
| 569290 ||  || — || September 10, 2005 || Anderson Mesa || LONEOS ||  || align=right | 2.9 km || 
|-id=291 bgcolor=#FA8072
| 569291 ||  || — || August 30, 2005 || Socorro || LINEAR ||  || align=right data-sort-value="0.99" | 990 m || 
|-id=292 bgcolor=#fefefe
| 569292 ||  || — || September 1, 2005 || Kitt Peak || Spacewatch ||  || align=right data-sort-value="0.71" | 710 m || 
|-id=293 bgcolor=#d6d6d6
| 569293 ||  || — || September 1, 2005 || Kitt Peak || Spacewatch ||  || align=right | 2.6 km || 
|-id=294 bgcolor=#d6d6d6
| 569294 ||  || — || November 20, 2000 || Apache Point || SDSS Collaboration ||  || align=right | 2.5 km || 
|-id=295 bgcolor=#d6d6d6
| 569295 ||  || — || September 1, 2005 || Kitt Peak || Spacewatch ||  || align=right | 2.9 km || 
|-id=296 bgcolor=#fefefe
| 569296 ||  || — || July 11, 2005 || Mount Lemmon || Mount Lemmon Survey ||  || align=right data-sort-value="0.71" | 710 m || 
|-id=297 bgcolor=#d6d6d6
| 569297 ||  || — || September 13, 2005 || Kitt Peak || Spacewatch || THM || align=right | 2.1 km || 
|-id=298 bgcolor=#E9E9E9
| 569298 ||  || — || September 3, 2005 || Mauna Kea || Mauna Kea Obs. ||  || align=right data-sort-value="0.79" | 790 m || 
|-id=299 bgcolor=#d6d6d6
| 569299 ||  || — || September 3, 2005 || Mauna Kea || Mauna Kea Obs. ||  || align=right | 2.0 km || 
|-id=300 bgcolor=#E9E9E9
| 569300 ||  || — || September 3, 2005 || Mauna Kea || Mauna Kea Obs. ||  || align=right data-sort-value="0.77" | 770 m || 
|}

569301–569400 

|-bgcolor=#E9E9E9
| 569301 ||  || — || September 3, 2005 || Mauna Kea || Mauna Kea Obs. ||  || align=right data-sort-value="0.73" | 730 m || 
|-id=302 bgcolor=#d6d6d6
| 569302 ||  || — || December 21, 2006 || Kitt Peak || Spacewatch ||  || align=right | 2.4 km || 
|-id=303 bgcolor=#E9E9E9
| 569303 ||  || — || January 10, 2007 || Kitt Peak || Spacewatch ||  || align=right | 1.1 km || 
|-id=304 bgcolor=#E9E9E9
| 569304 ||  || — || September 18, 2001 || Kitt Peak || Spacewatch ||  || align=right | 1.4 km || 
|-id=305 bgcolor=#d6d6d6
| 569305 ||  || — || September 1, 2005 || Palomar || NEAT ||  || align=right | 2.9 km || 
|-id=306 bgcolor=#d6d6d6
| 569306 ||  || — || September 13, 2005 || Kitt Peak || Spacewatch ||  || align=right | 2.5 km || 
|-id=307 bgcolor=#d6d6d6
| 569307 ||  || — || July 5, 2005 || Kitt Peak || Spacewatch ||  || align=right | 2.5 km || 
|-id=308 bgcolor=#d6d6d6
| 569308 ||  || — || September 13, 2005 || Kitt Peak || Spacewatch ||  || align=right | 2.5 km || 
|-id=309 bgcolor=#d6d6d6
| 569309 ||  || — || October 20, 2016 || Mount Lemmon || Mount Lemmon Survey ||  || align=right | 2.6 km || 
|-id=310 bgcolor=#fefefe
| 569310 ||  || — || September 1, 2013 || Haleakala || Pan-STARRS || H || align=right data-sort-value="0.64" | 640 m || 
|-id=311 bgcolor=#d6d6d6
| 569311 ||  || — || September 14, 2005 || Kitt Peak || Spacewatch ||  || align=right | 3.2 km || 
|-id=312 bgcolor=#d6d6d6
| 569312 ||  || — || November 18, 2017 || Haleakala || Pan-STARRS ||  || align=right | 2.2 km || 
|-id=313 bgcolor=#E9E9E9
| 569313 ||  || — || September 1, 2005 || Kitt Peak || Spacewatch ||  || align=right data-sort-value="0.87" | 870 m || 
|-id=314 bgcolor=#E9E9E9
| 569314 ||  || — || September 13, 2005 || Kitt Peak || Spacewatch ||  || align=right data-sort-value="0.73" | 730 m || 
|-id=315 bgcolor=#d6d6d6
| 569315 ||  || — || November 18, 2006 || Mount Lemmon || Mount Lemmon Survey ||  || align=right | 2.2 km || 
|-id=316 bgcolor=#d6d6d6
| 569316 ||  || — || September 13, 2005 || Kitt Peak || Spacewatch ||  || align=right | 2.3 km || 
|-id=317 bgcolor=#d6d6d6
| 569317 ||  || — || September 1, 2005 || Kitt Peak || Spacewatch ||  || align=right | 2.3 km || 
|-id=318 bgcolor=#d6d6d6
| 569318 ||  || — || September 1, 2005 || Kitt Peak || Spacewatch ||  || align=right | 2.7 km || 
|-id=319 bgcolor=#fefefe
| 569319 ||  || — || August 29, 2005 || Palomar || NEAT ||  || align=right data-sort-value="0.59" | 590 m || 
|-id=320 bgcolor=#d6d6d6
| 569320 ||  || — || September 25, 2005 || Kitt Peak || Spacewatch || 3:2 || align=right | 4.0 km || 
|-id=321 bgcolor=#d6d6d6
| 569321 ||  || — || August 25, 2005 || Palomar || NEAT ||  || align=right | 3.0 km || 
|-id=322 bgcolor=#d6d6d6
| 569322 ||  || — || September 26, 2005 || Kitt Peak || Spacewatch ||  || align=right | 2.0 km || 
|-id=323 bgcolor=#d6d6d6
| 569323 ||  || — || September 26, 2005 || Kitt Peak || Spacewatch ||  || align=right | 3.2 km || 
|-id=324 bgcolor=#d6d6d6
| 569324 ||  || — || September 26, 2005 || Palomar || NEAT ||  || align=right | 2.9 km || 
|-id=325 bgcolor=#d6d6d6
| 569325 ||  || — || September 24, 2005 || Kitt Peak || Spacewatch ||  || align=right | 2.8 km || 
|-id=326 bgcolor=#d6d6d6
| 569326 ||  || — || September 24, 2005 || Kitt Peak || Spacewatch || LIX || align=right | 3.5 km || 
|-id=327 bgcolor=#d6d6d6
| 569327 ||  || — || September 26, 2005 || Kitt Peak || Spacewatch ||  || align=right | 2.1 km || 
|-id=328 bgcolor=#d6d6d6
| 569328 ||  || — || September 26, 2005 || Kitt Peak || Spacewatch ||  || align=right | 2.0 km || 
|-id=329 bgcolor=#E9E9E9
| 569329 ||  || — || September 27, 2005 || Kitt Peak || Spacewatch ||  || align=right | 1.1 km || 
|-id=330 bgcolor=#d6d6d6
| 569330 ||  || — || September 24, 2005 || Kitt Peak || Spacewatch ||  || align=right | 2.5 km || 
|-id=331 bgcolor=#E9E9E9
| 569331 ||  || — || September 24, 2005 || Kitt Peak || Spacewatch ||  || align=right | 1.4 km || 
|-id=332 bgcolor=#d6d6d6
| 569332 ||  || — || September 25, 2005 || Kitt Peak || Spacewatch ||  || align=right | 2.6 km || 
|-id=333 bgcolor=#d6d6d6
| 569333 ||  || — || August 30, 2005 || Socorro || LINEAR ||  || align=right | 2.8 km || 
|-id=334 bgcolor=#d6d6d6
| 569334 ||  || — || August 29, 2005 || Palomar || NEAT ||  || align=right | 2.8 km || 
|-id=335 bgcolor=#d6d6d6
| 569335 ||  || — || September 27, 2005 || Kitt Peak || Spacewatch ||  || align=right | 3.1 km || 
|-id=336 bgcolor=#fefefe
| 569336 ||  || — || August 31, 2005 || Palomar || NEAT ||  || align=right data-sort-value="0.64" | 640 m || 
|-id=337 bgcolor=#E9E9E9
| 569337 ||  || — || September 29, 2005 || Mount Lemmon || Mount Lemmon Survey ||  || align=right | 1.8 km || 
|-id=338 bgcolor=#d6d6d6
| 569338 ||  || — || September 29, 2005 || Mount Lemmon || Mount Lemmon Survey ||  || align=right | 2.2 km || 
|-id=339 bgcolor=#fefefe
| 569339 ||  || — || September 25, 2005 || Kitt Peak || Spacewatch ||  || align=right data-sort-value="0.51" | 510 m || 
|-id=340 bgcolor=#d6d6d6
| 569340 ||  || — || September 25, 2005 || Kitt Peak || Spacewatch ||  || align=right | 2.4 km || 
|-id=341 bgcolor=#fefefe
| 569341 ||  || — || August 30, 2005 || Palomar || NEAT ||  || align=right data-sort-value="0.71" | 710 m || 
|-id=342 bgcolor=#d6d6d6
| 569342 ||  || — || September 26, 2005 || Kitt Peak || Spacewatch ||  || align=right | 2.7 km || 
|-id=343 bgcolor=#d6d6d6
| 569343 ||  || — || September 26, 2005 || Palomar || NEAT ||  || align=right | 3.2 km || 
|-id=344 bgcolor=#d6d6d6
| 569344 ||  || — || September 26, 2005 || Kitt Peak || Spacewatch ||  || align=right | 2.6 km || 
|-id=345 bgcolor=#E9E9E9
| 569345 ||  || — || September 8, 2005 || Socorro || LINEAR ||  || align=right data-sort-value="0.95" | 950 m || 
|-id=346 bgcolor=#d6d6d6
| 569346 ||  || — || September 1, 2005 || Kitt Peak || Spacewatch ||  || align=right | 2.9 km || 
|-id=347 bgcolor=#fefefe
| 569347 ||  || — || September 29, 2005 || Kitt Peak || Spacewatch ||  || align=right data-sort-value="0.62" | 620 m || 
|-id=348 bgcolor=#d6d6d6
| 569348 ||  || — || September 29, 2005 || Kitt Peak || Spacewatch ||  || align=right | 2.8 km || 
|-id=349 bgcolor=#d6d6d6
| 569349 ||  || — || September 29, 2005 || Kitt Peak || Spacewatch ||  || align=right | 2.5 km || 
|-id=350 bgcolor=#fefefe
| 569350 ||  || — || September 29, 2005 || Anderson Mesa || LONEOS ||  || align=right data-sort-value="0.60" | 600 m || 
|-id=351 bgcolor=#d6d6d6
| 569351 ||  || — || August 25, 2005 || Palomar || NEAT ||  || align=right | 2.3 km || 
|-id=352 bgcolor=#d6d6d6
| 569352 ||  || — || September 30, 2005 || Mount Lemmon || Mount Lemmon Survey ||  || align=right | 2.3 km || 
|-id=353 bgcolor=#E9E9E9
| 569353 ||  || — || September 29, 2005 || Mount Lemmon || Mount Lemmon Survey ||  || align=right data-sort-value="0.90" | 900 m || 
|-id=354 bgcolor=#d6d6d6
| 569354 ||  || — || September 29, 2005 || Mount Lemmon || Mount Lemmon Survey ||  || align=right | 1.8 km || 
|-id=355 bgcolor=#d6d6d6
| 569355 ||  || — || September 29, 2005 || Kitt Peak || Spacewatch ||  || align=right | 1.9 km || 
|-id=356 bgcolor=#E9E9E9
| 569356 ||  || — || September 29, 2005 || Kitt Peak || Spacewatch ||  || align=right | 1.4 km || 
|-id=357 bgcolor=#d6d6d6
| 569357 ||  || — || September 29, 2005 || Kitt Peak || Spacewatch ||  || align=right | 2.8 km || 
|-id=358 bgcolor=#d6d6d6
| 569358 ||  || — || September 30, 2005 || Palomar || NEAT ||  || align=right | 2.6 km || 
|-id=359 bgcolor=#d6d6d6
| 569359 ||  || — || September 30, 2005 || Mount Lemmon || Mount Lemmon Survey ||  || align=right | 2.3 km || 
|-id=360 bgcolor=#E9E9E9
| 569360 ||  || — || September 30, 2005 || Mount Lemmon || Mount Lemmon Survey ||  || align=right | 1.2 km || 
|-id=361 bgcolor=#E9E9E9
| 569361 ||  || — || August 31, 2005 || Palomar || NEAT ||  || align=right | 1.0 km || 
|-id=362 bgcolor=#d6d6d6
| 569362 ||  || — || May 13, 2009 || Mount Lemmon || Mount Lemmon Survey ||  || align=right | 2.5 km || 
|-id=363 bgcolor=#E9E9E9
| 569363 ||  || — || September 24, 2005 || Kitt Peak || Spacewatch ||  || align=right | 1.3 km || 
|-id=364 bgcolor=#d6d6d6
| 569364 ||  || — || September 29, 2005 || Kitt Peak || Spacewatch ||  || align=right | 2.2 km || 
|-id=365 bgcolor=#d6d6d6
| 569365 ||  || — || September 27, 2005 || Kitt Peak || Spacewatch ||  || align=right | 2.3 km || 
|-id=366 bgcolor=#d6d6d6
| 569366 ||  || — || August 29, 2005 || Palomar || NEAT ||  || align=right | 3.7 km || 
|-id=367 bgcolor=#d6d6d6
| 569367 ||  || — || June 27, 2004 || Kitt Peak || Spacewatch || 3:2 || align=right | 4.0 km || 
|-id=368 bgcolor=#d6d6d6
| 569368 ||  || — || October 31, 2005 || Apache Point || SDSS Collaboration || EOS || align=right | 1.6 km || 
|-id=369 bgcolor=#d6d6d6
| 569369 ||  || — || October 1, 2005 || Apache Point || SDSS Collaboration ||  || align=right | 2.9 km || 
|-id=370 bgcolor=#d6d6d6
| 569370 ||  || — || October 1, 2005 || Apache Point || SDSS Collaboration || EOS || align=right | 1.9 km || 
|-id=371 bgcolor=#E9E9E9
| 569371 ||  || — || April 25, 2004 || Kitt Peak || Spacewatch ||  || align=right data-sort-value="0.87" | 870 m || 
|-id=372 bgcolor=#d6d6d6
| 569372 ||  || — || December 26, 2006 || Kitt Peak || Spacewatch ||  || align=right | 2.6 km || 
|-id=373 bgcolor=#d6d6d6
| 569373 ||  || — || October 1, 2005 || Apache Point || SDSS Collaboration ||  || align=right | 2.4 km || 
|-id=374 bgcolor=#d6d6d6
| 569374 ||  || — || January 17, 2007 || Kitt Peak || Spacewatch || EOS || align=right | 1.8 km || 
|-id=375 bgcolor=#d6d6d6
| 569375 ||  || — || October 1, 2005 || Apache Point || SDSS Collaboration || VER || align=right | 2.1 km || 
|-id=376 bgcolor=#fefefe
| 569376 ||  || — || September 27, 2005 || Apache Point || SDSS Collaboration ||  || align=right data-sort-value="0.43" | 430 m || 
|-id=377 bgcolor=#d6d6d6
| 569377 ||  || — || September 26, 2005 || Kitt Peak || Spacewatch ||  || align=right | 3.2 km || 
|-id=378 bgcolor=#E9E9E9
| 569378 ||  || — || September 23, 2005 || Kitt Peak || Spacewatch ||  || align=right | 1.2 km || 
|-id=379 bgcolor=#fefefe
| 569379 ||  || — || September 23, 2005 || Catalina || CSS ||  || align=right data-sort-value="0.65" | 650 m || 
|-id=380 bgcolor=#d6d6d6
| 569380 ||  || — || September 30, 2005 || Mount Lemmon || Mount Lemmon Survey ||  || align=right | 2.4 km || 
|-id=381 bgcolor=#E9E9E9
| 569381 ||  || — || September 30, 2005 || Mount Lemmon || Mount Lemmon Survey ||  || align=right data-sort-value="0.54" | 540 m || 
|-id=382 bgcolor=#d6d6d6
| 569382 ||  || — || September 26, 2005 || Kitt Peak || Spacewatch ||  || align=right | 2.1 km || 
|-id=383 bgcolor=#d6d6d6
| 569383 ||  || — || February 8, 2013 || Haleakala || Pan-STARRS ||  || align=right | 2.7 km || 
|-id=384 bgcolor=#d6d6d6
| 569384 ||  || — || February 26, 2014 || Haleakala || Pan-STARRS ||  || align=right | 2.4 km || 
|-id=385 bgcolor=#d6d6d6
| 569385 ||  || — || September 30, 2005 || Mount Lemmon || Mount Lemmon Survey ||  || align=right | 2.8 km || 
|-id=386 bgcolor=#d6d6d6
| 569386 ||  || — || September 28, 2011 || Mount Lemmon || Mount Lemmon Survey ||  || align=right | 2.7 km || 
|-id=387 bgcolor=#fefefe
| 569387 ||  || — || January 30, 2011 || Haleakala || Pan-STARRS ||  || align=right data-sort-value="0.71" | 710 m || 
|-id=388 bgcolor=#d6d6d6
| 569388 ||  || — || September 29, 2005 || Mount Lemmon || Mount Lemmon Survey ||  || align=right | 2.7 km || 
|-id=389 bgcolor=#fefefe
| 569389 ||  || — || September 29, 2005 || Mount Lemmon || Mount Lemmon Survey ||  || align=right data-sort-value="0.57" | 570 m || 
|-id=390 bgcolor=#d6d6d6
| 569390 ||  || — || April 23, 2014 || Haleakala || Pan-STARRS ||  || align=right | 2.0 km || 
|-id=391 bgcolor=#fefefe
| 569391 ||  || — || September 11, 2005 || Kitt Peak || Spacewatch ||  || align=right data-sort-value="0.62" | 620 m || 
|-id=392 bgcolor=#E9E9E9
| 569392 ||  || — || September 26, 2005 || Kitt Peak || Spacewatch ||  || align=right data-sort-value="0.90" | 900 m || 
|-id=393 bgcolor=#d6d6d6
| 569393 ||  || — || September 29, 2005 || Mount Lemmon || Mount Lemmon Survey ||  || align=right | 2.2 km || 
|-id=394 bgcolor=#d6d6d6
| 569394 ||  || — || August 29, 2005 || Anderson Mesa || LONEOS ||  || align=right | 2.2 km || 
|-id=395 bgcolor=#E9E9E9
| 569395 ||  || — || October 1, 2005 || Mount Lemmon || Mount Lemmon Survey ||  || align=right data-sort-value="0.71" | 710 m || 
|-id=396 bgcolor=#E9E9E9
| 569396 ||  || — || October 1, 2005 || Kitt Peak || Spacewatch ||  || align=right | 1.7 km || 
|-id=397 bgcolor=#FA8072
| 569397 ||  || — || October 3, 2005 || Catalina || CSS ||  || align=right data-sort-value="0.58" | 580 m || 
|-id=398 bgcolor=#d6d6d6
| 569398 ||  || — || October 1, 2005 || Mount Lemmon || Mount Lemmon Survey ||  || align=right | 2.2 km || 
|-id=399 bgcolor=#d6d6d6
| 569399 ||  || — || October 1, 2005 || Kitt Peak || Spacewatch ||  || align=right | 2.5 km || 
|-id=400 bgcolor=#d6d6d6
| 569400 ||  || — || October 1, 2005 || Kitt Peak || Spacewatch || VER || align=right | 3.3 km || 
|}

569401–569500 

|-bgcolor=#d6d6d6
| 569401 ||  || — || October 1, 2005 || Kitt Peak || Spacewatch ||  || align=right | 2.8 km || 
|-id=402 bgcolor=#E9E9E9
| 569402 ||  || — || October 1, 2005 || Kitt Peak || Spacewatch ||  || align=right data-sort-value="0.70" | 700 m || 
|-id=403 bgcolor=#E9E9E9
| 569403 ||  || — || October 1, 2005 || Mount Lemmon || Mount Lemmon Survey ||  || align=right | 1.9 km || 
|-id=404 bgcolor=#fefefe
| 569404 ||  || — || October 1, 2005 || Kitt Peak || Spacewatch ||  || align=right data-sort-value="0.57" | 570 m || 
|-id=405 bgcolor=#d6d6d6
| 569405 ||  || — || October 2, 2005 || Mount Lemmon || Mount Lemmon Survey ||  || align=right | 2.7 km || 
|-id=406 bgcolor=#d6d6d6
| 569406 ||  || — || September 24, 2005 || Kitt Peak || Spacewatch ||  || align=right | 1.9 km || 
|-id=407 bgcolor=#d6d6d6
| 569407 ||  || — || October 3, 2005 || Catalina || CSS ||  || align=right | 3.2 km || 
|-id=408 bgcolor=#fefefe
| 569408 ||  || — || October 5, 2005 || Catalina || CSS ||  || align=right data-sort-value="0.54" | 540 m || 
|-id=409 bgcolor=#fefefe
| 569409 ||  || — || September 2, 2005 || Palomar || NEAT ||  || align=right data-sort-value="0.86" | 860 m || 
|-id=410 bgcolor=#d6d6d6
| 569410 ||  || — || September 11, 2005 || Vail-Jarnac || Jarnac Obs. ||  || align=right | 3.4 km || 
|-id=411 bgcolor=#fefefe
| 569411 ||  || — || October 3, 2005 || Kitt Peak || Spacewatch || H || align=right data-sort-value="0.60" | 600 m || 
|-id=412 bgcolor=#E9E9E9
| 569412 ||  || — || October 3, 2005 || Kitt Peak || Spacewatch ||  || align=right data-sort-value="0.80" | 800 m || 
|-id=413 bgcolor=#d6d6d6
| 569413 ||  || — || October 3, 2005 || Kitt Peak || Spacewatch ||  || align=right | 2.8 km || 
|-id=414 bgcolor=#d6d6d6
| 569414 ||  || — || October 3, 2005 || Kitt Peak || Spacewatch ||  || align=right | 2.6 km || 
|-id=415 bgcolor=#E9E9E9
| 569415 ||  || — || October 5, 2005 || Kitt Peak || Spacewatch ||  || align=right | 2.4 km || 
|-id=416 bgcolor=#d6d6d6
| 569416 ||  || — || September 25, 2005 || Kitt Peak || Spacewatch ||  || align=right | 2.9 km || 
|-id=417 bgcolor=#d6d6d6
| 569417 ||  || — || October 7, 2005 || Kitt Peak || Spacewatch ||  || align=right | 2.7 km || 
|-id=418 bgcolor=#d6d6d6
| 569418 ||  || — || October 7, 2005 || Kitt Peak || Spacewatch ||  || align=right | 2.0 km || 
|-id=419 bgcolor=#E9E9E9
| 569419 ||  || — || October 7, 2005 || Kitt Peak || Spacewatch ||  || align=right data-sort-value="0.60" | 600 m || 
|-id=420 bgcolor=#d6d6d6
| 569420 ||  || — || October 7, 2005 || Kitt Peak || Spacewatch ||  || align=right | 2.8 km || 
|-id=421 bgcolor=#d6d6d6
| 569421 ||  || — || September 27, 2005 || Kitt Peak || Spacewatch ||  || align=right | 2.0 km || 
|-id=422 bgcolor=#d6d6d6
| 569422 ||  || — || October 3, 2005 || Kitt Peak || Spacewatch ||  || align=right | 2.2 km || 
|-id=423 bgcolor=#d6d6d6
| 569423 ||  || — || September 29, 2005 || Kitt Peak || Spacewatch ||  || align=right | 2.2 km || 
|-id=424 bgcolor=#E9E9E9
| 569424 ||  || — || October 7, 2005 || Kitt Peak || Spacewatch ||  || align=right data-sort-value="0.72" | 720 m || 
|-id=425 bgcolor=#d6d6d6
| 569425 ||  || — || October 7, 2005 || Kitt Peak || Spacewatch ||  || align=right | 2.3 km || 
|-id=426 bgcolor=#d6d6d6
| 569426 ||  || — || July 17, 2004 || Cerro Tololo || Cerro Tololo Obs. || 3:2 || align=right | 4.1 km || 
|-id=427 bgcolor=#d6d6d6
| 569427 ||  || — || October 9, 2005 || Kitt Peak || Spacewatch ||  || align=right | 2.9 km || 
|-id=428 bgcolor=#fefefe
| 569428 ||  || — || September 25, 2005 || Kitt Peak || Spacewatch ||  || align=right data-sort-value="0.54" | 540 m || 
|-id=429 bgcolor=#d6d6d6
| 569429 ||  || — || October 6, 2005 || Kitt Peak || Spacewatch ||  || align=right | 3.1 km || 
|-id=430 bgcolor=#fefefe
| 569430 ||  || — || September 29, 2005 || Mount Lemmon || Mount Lemmon Survey ||  || align=right data-sort-value="0.52" | 520 m || 
|-id=431 bgcolor=#d6d6d6
| 569431 ||  || — || October 8, 2005 || Kitt Peak || Spacewatch ||  || align=right | 2.3 km || 
|-id=432 bgcolor=#d6d6d6
| 569432 ||  || — || October 8, 2005 || Kitt Peak || Spacewatch ||  || align=right | 3.3 km || 
|-id=433 bgcolor=#d6d6d6
| 569433 ||  || — || October 8, 2005 || Kitt Peak || Spacewatch ||  || align=right | 2.6 km || 
|-id=434 bgcolor=#E9E9E9
| 569434 ||  || — || October 8, 2005 || Kitt Peak || Spacewatch ||  || align=right data-sort-value="0.43" | 430 m || 
|-id=435 bgcolor=#d6d6d6
| 569435 ||  || — || August 29, 2005 || Palomar || NEAT ||  || align=right | 2.8 km || 
|-id=436 bgcolor=#E9E9E9
| 569436 ||  || — || October 9, 2005 || Kitt Peak || Spacewatch ||  || align=right data-sort-value="0.86" | 860 m || 
|-id=437 bgcolor=#d6d6d6
| 569437 ||  || — || October 9, 2005 || Kitt Peak || Spacewatch ||  || align=right | 2.2 km || 
|-id=438 bgcolor=#d6d6d6
| 569438 ||  || — || October 9, 2005 || Kitt Peak || Spacewatch ||  || align=right | 2.6 km || 
|-id=439 bgcolor=#fefefe
| 569439 ||  || — || October 9, 2005 || Kitt Peak || Spacewatch ||  || align=right data-sort-value="0.72" | 720 m || 
|-id=440 bgcolor=#E9E9E9
| 569440 ||  || — || April 7, 2003 || Kitt Peak || Spacewatch ||  || align=right | 1.4 km || 
|-id=441 bgcolor=#d6d6d6
| 569441 ||  || — || October 2, 2005 || Mount Lemmon || Mount Lemmon Survey ||  || align=right | 2.6 km || 
|-id=442 bgcolor=#fefefe
| 569442 ||  || — || September 29, 2005 || Mount Lemmon || Mount Lemmon Survey ||  || align=right data-sort-value="0.60" | 600 m || 
|-id=443 bgcolor=#E9E9E9
| 569443 ||  || — || October 9, 2005 || Kitt Peak || Spacewatch ||  || align=right data-sort-value="0.84" | 840 m || 
|-id=444 bgcolor=#d6d6d6
| 569444 ||  || — || October 5, 2005 || Mount Lemmon || Mount Lemmon Survey ||  || align=right | 2.4 km || 
|-id=445 bgcolor=#d6d6d6
| 569445 ||  || — || October 1, 2005 || Mount Lemmon || Mount Lemmon Survey ||  || align=right | 2.4 km || 
|-id=446 bgcolor=#fefefe
| 569446 ||  || — || September 3, 2005 || Palomar || NEAT || H || align=right data-sort-value="0.88" | 880 m || 
|-id=447 bgcolor=#E9E9E9
| 569447 ||  || — || September 19, 1993 || Kitt Peak || Spacewatch ||  || align=right data-sort-value="0.74" | 740 m || 
|-id=448 bgcolor=#d6d6d6
| 569448 ||  || — || October 1, 2005 || Kitt Peak || Spacewatch ||  || align=right | 2.6 km || 
|-id=449 bgcolor=#d6d6d6
| 569449 ||  || — || October 3, 2005 || Kitt Peak || Spacewatch ||  || align=right | 2.5 km || 
|-id=450 bgcolor=#d6d6d6
| 569450 ||  || — || September 23, 2005 || Kitt Peak || Spacewatch ||  || align=right | 2.6 km || 
|-id=451 bgcolor=#d6d6d6
| 569451 ||  || — || October 6, 2005 || Mount Lemmon || Mount Lemmon Survey ||  || align=right | 2.3 km || 
|-id=452 bgcolor=#E9E9E9
| 569452 ||  || — || March 30, 2003 || Kitt Peak || Spacewatch ||  || align=right | 1.4 km || 
|-id=453 bgcolor=#fefefe
| 569453 ||  || — || March 29, 2004 || Kitt Peak || Spacewatch ||  || align=right data-sort-value="0.61" | 610 m || 
|-id=454 bgcolor=#d6d6d6
| 569454 ||  || — || August 30, 2005 || Palomar || NEAT ||  || align=right | 3.2 km || 
|-id=455 bgcolor=#d6d6d6
| 569455 ||  || — || October 10, 2005 || Catalina || CSS ||  || align=right | 2.6 km || 
|-id=456 bgcolor=#d6d6d6
| 569456 ||  || — || February 9, 2013 || Haleakala || Pan-STARRS ||  || align=right | 2.4 km || 
|-id=457 bgcolor=#fefefe
| 569457 ||  || — || February 23, 2007 || Mount Lemmon || Mount Lemmon Survey ||  || align=right data-sort-value="0.68" | 680 m || 
|-id=458 bgcolor=#fefefe
| 569458 ||  || — || February 21, 2007 || Mount Lemmon || Mount Lemmon Survey ||  || align=right data-sort-value="0.60" | 600 m || 
|-id=459 bgcolor=#d6d6d6
| 569459 ||  || — || April 20, 2014 || Mount Lemmon || Mount Lemmon Survey ||  || align=right | 3.0 km || 
|-id=460 bgcolor=#d6d6d6
| 569460 ||  || — || October 1, 2005 || Kitt Peak || Spacewatch ||  || align=right | 2.6 km || 
|-id=461 bgcolor=#E9E9E9
| 569461 ||  || — || December 13, 2010 || Mount Lemmon || Mount Lemmon Survey ||  || align=right data-sort-value="0.94" | 940 m || 
|-id=462 bgcolor=#E9E9E9
| 569462 ||  || — || October 13, 2005 || Kitt Peak || Spacewatch ||  || align=right data-sort-value="0.91" | 910 m || 
|-id=463 bgcolor=#E9E9E9
| 569463 ||  || — || March 28, 2008 || Kitt Peak || Spacewatch ||  || align=right data-sort-value="0.76" | 760 m || 
|-id=464 bgcolor=#d6d6d6
| 569464 ||  || — || October 13, 2005 || Kitt Peak || Spacewatch ||  || align=right | 2.2 km || 
|-id=465 bgcolor=#d6d6d6
| 569465 ||  || — || October 13, 2005 || Kitt Peak || Spacewatch ||  || align=right | 2.6 km || 
|-id=466 bgcolor=#fefefe
| 569466 ||  || — || October 7, 2005 || Kitt Peak || Spacewatch ||  || align=right data-sort-value="0.54" | 540 m || 
|-id=467 bgcolor=#fefefe
| 569467 ||  || — || August 11, 2008 || La Sagra || OAM Obs. ||  || align=right data-sort-value="0.51" | 510 m || 
|-id=468 bgcolor=#d6d6d6
| 569468 ||  || — || February 9, 2008 || Mount Lemmon || Mount Lemmon Survey ||  || align=right | 2.5 km || 
|-id=469 bgcolor=#d6d6d6
| 569469 ||  || — || October 1, 2005 || Mount Lemmon || Mount Lemmon Survey ||  || align=right | 2.9 km || 
|-id=470 bgcolor=#d6d6d6
| 569470 ||  || — || August 8, 2016 || Haleakala || Pan-STARRS ||  || align=right | 2.5 km || 
|-id=471 bgcolor=#E9E9E9
| 569471 ||  || — || January 27, 2007 || Kitt Peak || Spacewatch ||  || align=right data-sort-value="0.71" | 710 m || 
|-id=472 bgcolor=#E9E9E9
| 569472 ||  || — || March 30, 2012 || Kitt Peak || Spacewatch ||  || align=right data-sort-value="0.76" | 760 m || 
|-id=473 bgcolor=#E9E9E9
| 569473 ||  || — || December 21, 2006 || Mount Lemmon || Mount Lemmon Survey ||  || align=right | 1.3 km || 
|-id=474 bgcolor=#fefefe
| 569474 ||  || — || October 1, 2005 || Mount Lemmon || Mount Lemmon Survey ||  || align=right data-sort-value="0.49" | 490 m || 
|-id=475 bgcolor=#d6d6d6
| 569475 ||  || — || August 29, 2016 || Mount Lemmon || Mount Lemmon Survey ||  || align=right | 2.5 km || 
|-id=476 bgcolor=#d6d6d6
| 569476 ||  || — || December 23, 2012 || Haleakala || Pan-STARRS ||  || align=right | 2.2 km || 
|-id=477 bgcolor=#E9E9E9
| 569477 ||  || — || October 7, 2005 || Mount Lemmon || Mount Lemmon Survey ||  || align=right | 1.6 km || 
|-id=478 bgcolor=#d6d6d6
| 569478 ||  || — || October 2, 2005 || Mount Lemmon || Mount Lemmon Survey ||  || align=right | 3.0 km || 
|-id=479 bgcolor=#d6d6d6
| 569479 ||  || — || October 1, 2005 || Mount Lemmon || Mount Lemmon Survey ||  || align=right | 2.3 km || 
|-id=480 bgcolor=#d6d6d6
| 569480 ||  || — || October 4, 2005 || Mount Lemmon || Mount Lemmon Survey ||  || align=right | 2.7 km || 
|-id=481 bgcolor=#d6d6d6
| 569481 ||  || — || October 1, 2005 || Mount Lemmon || Mount Lemmon Survey ||  || align=right | 2.5 km || 
|-id=482 bgcolor=#fefefe
| 569482 ||  || — || October 1, 2005 || Mount Lemmon || Mount Lemmon Survey ||  || align=right data-sort-value="0.68" | 680 m || 
|-id=483 bgcolor=#d6d6d6
| 569483 ||  || — || October 12, 2005 || Kitt Peak || Spacewatch ||  || align=right | 2.5 km || 
|-id=484 bgcolor=#fefefe
| 569484 Irisdement ||  ||  || October 26, 2005 || Nogales || J.-C. Merlin ||  || align=right data-sort-value="0.71" | 710 m || 
|-id=485 bgcolor=#fefefe
| 569485 ||  || — || October 22, 2005 || Great Shefford || P. Birtwhistle ||  || align=right data-sort-value="0.75" | 750 m || 
|-id=486 bgcolor=#d6d6d6
| 569486 ||  || — || October 5, 2005 || Kitt Peak || Spacewatch ||  || align=right | 3.0 km || 
|-id=487 bgcolor=#E9E9E9
| 569487 ||  || — || October 22, 2005 || Kitt Peak || Spacewatch ||  || align=right data-sort-value="0.65" | 650 m || 
|-id=488 bgcolor=#fefefe
| 569488 ||  || — || October 23, 2005 || Kitt Peak || Spacewatch ||  || align=right data-sort-value="0.76" | 760 m || 
|-id=489 bgcolor=#d6d6d6
| 569489 ||  || — || October 23, 2005 || Kitt Peak || Spacewatch ||  || align=right | 2.7 km || 
|-id=490 bgcolor=#d6d6d6
| 569490 ||  || — || September 25, 2005 || Palomar || NEAT ||  || align=right | 3.8 km || 
|-id=491 bgcolor=#d6d6d6
| 569491 ||  || — || September 30, 2005 || Mount Lemmon || Mount Lemmon Survey || critical || align=right | 2.3 km || 
|-id=492 bgcolor=#d6d6d6
| 569492 ||  || — || October 24, 2005 || Kitt Peak || Spacewatch ||  || align=right | 2.0 km || 
|-id=493 bgcolor=#fefefe
| 569493 ||  || — || October 22, 2005 || Kitt Peak || Spacewatch ||  || align=right data-sort-value="0.78" | 780 m || 
|-id=494 bgcolor=#d6d6d6
| 569494 ||  || — || August 27, 2005 || Palomar || NEAT ||  || align=right | 2.5 km || 
|-id=495 bgcolor=#d6d6d6
| 569495 ||  || — || October 25, 2005 || Anderson Mesa || LONEOS ||  || align=right | 4.5 km || 
|-id=496 bgcolor=#E9E9E9
| 569496 ||  || — || October 22, 2005 || Kitt Peak || Spacewatch ||  || align=right | 2.2 km || 
|-id=497 bgcolor=#fefefe
| 569497 ||  || — || October 22, 2005 || Kitt Peak || Spacewatch ||  || align=right data-sort-value="0.70" | 700 m || 
|-id=498 bgcolor=#d6d6d6
| 569498 ||  || — || June 1, 2003 || Cerro Tololo || M. W. Buie, K. J. Meech ||  || align=right | 2.1 km || 
|-id=499 bgcolor=#E9E9E9
| 569499 ||  || — || October 22, 2005 || Kitt Peak || Spacewatch ||  || align=right | 1.0 km || 
|-id=500 bgcolor=#E9E9E9
| 569500 ||  || — || October 22, 2005 || Kitt Peak || Spacewatch ||  || align=right | 1.4 km || 
|}

569501–569600 

|-bgcolor=#fefefe
| 569501 ||  || — || October 22, 2005 || Kitt Peak || Spacewatch ||  || align=right data-sort-value="0.62" | 620 m || 
|-id=502 bgcolor=#E9E9E9
| 569502 ||  || — || October 22, 2005 || Kitt Peak || Spacewatch ||  || align=right | 2.4 km || 
|-id=503 bgcolor=#E9E9E9
| 569503 ||  || — || October 22, 2005 || Kitt Peak || Spacewatch ||  || align=right | 1.5 km || 
|-id=504 bgcolor=#E9E9E9
| 569504 ||  || — || October 24, 2005 || Kitt Peak || Spacewatch ||  || align=right data-sort-value="0.66" | 660 m || 
|-id=505 bgcolor=#E9E9E9
| 569505 ||  || — || October 24, 2005 || Kitt Peak || Spacewatch ||  || align=right | 1.8 km || 
|-id=506 bgcolor=#d6d6d6
| 569506 ||  || — || October 24, 2005 || Kitt Peak || Spacewatch ||  || align=right | 2.7 km || 
|-id=507 bgcolor=#d6d6d6
| 569507 ||  || — || October 11, 2005 || Kitt Peak || Spacewatch ||  || align=right | 2.5 km || 
|-id=508 bgcolor=#E9E9E9
| 569508 ||  || — || September 30, 2005 || Mount Lemmon || Mount Lemmon Survey ||  || align=right | 1.2 km || 
|-id=509 bgcolor=#E9E9E9
| 569509 ||  || — || October 25, 2005 || Mount Lemmon || Mount Lemmon Survey ||  || align=right | 1.2 km || 
|-id=510 bgcolor=#d6d6d6
| 569510 ||  || — || October 26, 2005 || Kitt Peak || Spacewatch ||  || align=right | 3.2 km || 
|-id=511 bgcolor=#fefefe
| 569511 ||  || — || October 26, 2005 || Kitt Peak || Spacewatch ||  || align=right data-sort-value="0.59" | 590 m || 
|-id=512 bgcolor=#fefefe
| 569512 ||  || — || October 22, 2005 || Palomar || NEAT ||  || align=right data-sort-value="0.85" | 850 m || 
|-id=513 bgcolor=#d6d6d6
| 569513 ||  || — || October 27, 2005 || Mount Lemmon || Mount Lemmon Survey ||  || align=right | 2.6 km || 
|-id=514 bgcolor=#d6d6d6
| 569514 ||  || — || September 29, 2005 || Mount Lemmon || Mount Lemmon Survey ||  || align=right | 2.3 km || 
|-id=515 bgcolor=#fefefe
| 569515 ||  || — || October 22, 2005 || Catalina || CSS ||  || align=right data-sort-value="0.58" | 580 m || 
|-id=516 bgcolor=#E9E9E9
| 569516 ||  || — || October 26, 2005 || Palomar || NEAT ||  || align=right | 1.1 km || 
|-id=517 bgcolor=#d6d6d6
| 569517 ||  || — || October 25, 2005 || Kitt Peak || Spacewatch ||  || align=right | 2.9 km || 
|-id=518 bgcolor=#d6d6d6
| 569518 ||  || — || October 25, 2005 || Kitt Peak || Spacewatch ||  || align=right | 3.2 km || 
|-id=519 bgcolor=#d6d6d6
| 569519 ||  || — || October 25, 2005 || Kitt Peak || Spacewatch ||  || align=right | 2.4 km || 
|-id=520 bgcolor=#d6d6d6
| 569520 ||  || — || October 25, 2005 || Kitt Peak || Spacewatch ||  || align=right | 2.1 km || 
|-id=521 bgcolor=#E9E9E9
| 569521 ||  || — || October 25, 2005 || Kitt Peak || Spacewatch ||  || align=right | 1.6 km || 
|-id=522 bgcolor=#fefefe
| 569522 ||  || — || October 25, 2005 || Kitt Peak || Spacewatch ||  || align=right data-sort-value="0.64" | 640 m || 
|-id=523 bgcolor=#d6d6d6
| 569523 ||  || — || October 25, 2005 || Kitt Peak || Spacewatch ||  || align=right | 2.9 km || 
|-id=524 bgcolor=#d6d6d6
| 569524 ||  || — || October 27, 2005 || Mount Lemmon || Mount Lemmon Survey ||  || align=right | 2.4 km || 
|-id=525 bgcolor=#E9E9E9
| 569525 ||  || — || October 27, 2005 || Kitt Peak || Spacewatch ||  || align=right | 1.4 km || 
|-id=526 bgcolor=#d6d6d6
| 569526 ||  || — || October 1, 2005 || Mount Lemmon || Mount Lemmon Survey ||  || align=right | 2.7 km || 
|-id=527 bgcolor=#E9E9E9
| 569527 ||  || — || October 28, 2005 || Mount Lemmon || Mount Lemmon Survey ||  || align=right | 1.3 km || 
|-id=528 bgcolor=#E9E9E9
| 569528 ||  || — || October 24, 2005 || Kitt Peak || Spacewatch ||  || align=right | 1.4 km || 
|-id=529 bgcolor=#E9E9E9
| 569529 ||  || — || October 26, 2005 || Kitt Peak || Spacewatch ||  || align=right data-sort-value="0.81" | 810 m || 
|-id=530 bgcolor=#fefefe
| 569530 ||  || — || October 26, 2005 || Kitt Peak || Spacewatch ||  || align=right data-sort-value="0.60" | 600 m || 
|-id=531 bgcolor=#d6d6d6
| 569531 ||  || — || October 26, 2005 || Kitt Peak || Spacewatch ||  || align=right | 2.5 km || 
|-id=532 bgcolor=#d6d6d6
| 569532 ||  || — || October 26, 2005 || Kitt Peak || Spacewatch ||  || align=right | 2.5 km || 
|-id=533 bgcolor=#fefefe
| 569533 ||  || — || October 26, 2005 || Kitt Peak || Spacewatch ||  || align=right data-sort-value="0.59" | 590 m || 
|-id=534 bgcolor=#E9E9E9
| 569534 ||  || — || October 26, 2005 || Kitt Peak || Spacewatch ||  || align=right | 1.1 km || 
|-id=535 bgcolor=#fefefe
| 569535 ||  || — || October 27, 2005 || Mount Lemmon || Mount Lemmon Survey ||  || align=right data-sort-value="0.43" | 430 m || 
|-id=536 bgcolor=#fefefe
| 569536 ||  || — || September 25, 2005 || Kitt Peak || Spacewatch ||  || align=right data-sort-value="0.65" | 650 m || 
|-id=537 bgcolor=#fefefe
| 569537 ||  || — || October 25, 2005 || Mount Lemmon || Mount Lemmon Survey ||  || align=right data-sort-value="0.56" | 560 m || 
|-id=538 bgcolor=#E9E9E9
| 569538 ||  || — || October 27, 2005 || Kitt Peak || Spacewatch ||  || align=right data-sort-value="0.79" | 790 m || 
|-id=539 bgcolor=#d6d6d6
| 569539 ||  || — || September 30, 2005 || Mount Lemmon || Mount Lemmon Survey ||  || align=right | 2.6 km || 
|-id=540 bgcolor=#d6d6d6
| 569540 ||  || — || October 29, 2005 || Mount Lemmon || Mount Lemmon Survey ||  || align=right | 2.4 km || 
|-id=541 bgcolor=#fefefe
| 569541 ||  || — || October 28, 2005 || Mount Lemmon || Mount Lemmon Survey ||  || align=right data-sort-value="0.71" | 710 m || 
|-id=542 bgcolor=#fefefe
| 569542 ||  || — || October 28, 2005 || Kitt Peak || Spacewatch ||  || align=right data-sort-value="0.49" | 490 m || 
|-id=543 bgcolor=#d6d6d6
| 569543 ||  || — || October 29, 2005 || Kitt Peak || Spacewatch ||  || align=right | 3.2 km || 
|-id=544 bgcolor=#fefefe
| 569544 ||  || — || October 31, 2005 || Mount Lemmon || Mount Lemmon Survey ||  || align=right data-sort-value="0.74" | 740 m || 
|-id=545 bgcolor=#fefefe
| 569545 ||  || — || October 30, 2005 || Kitt Peak || Spacewatch ||  || align=right data-sort-value="0.64" | 640 m || 
|-id=546 bgcolor=#d6d6d6
| 569546 ||  || — || August 30, 2005 || Palomar || NEAT ||  || align=right | 3.7 km || 
|-id=547 bgcolor=#d6d6d6
| 569547 ||  || — || October 10, 2005 || Moletai || K. Černis, J. Zdanavičius ||  || align=right | 3.6 km || 
|-id=548 bgcolor=#d6d6d6
| 569548 ||  || — || October 25, 2005 || Kitt Peak || Spacewatch ||  || align=right | 2.4 km || 
|-id=549 bgcolor=#E9E9E9
| 569549 ||  || — || October 27, 2005 || Kitt Peak || Spacewatch ||  || align=right | 1.3 km || 
|-id=550 bgcolor=#d6d6d6
| 569550 ||  || — || October 27, 2005 || Kitt Peak || Spacewatch ||  || align=right | 2.4 km || 
|-id=551 bgcolor=#E9E9E9
| 569551 ||  || — || October 27, 2005 || Kitt Peak || Spacewatch ||  || align=right | 1.2 km || 
|-id=552 bgcolor=#fefefe
| 569552 ||  || — || October 27, 2005 || Kitt Peak || Spacewatch ||  || align=right data-sort-value="0.48" | 480 m || 
|-id=553 bgcolor=#d6d6d6
| 569553 ||  || — || October 27, 2005 || Kitt Peak || Spacewatch ||  || align=right | 2.0 km || 
|-id=554 bgcolor=#E9E9E9
| 569554 ||  || — || September 30, 2005 || Mount Lemmon || Mount Lemmon Survey ||  || align=right data-sort-value="0.82" | 820 m || 
|-id=555 bgcolor=#d6d6d6
| 569555 ||  || — || October 27, 2005 || Kitt Peak || Spacewatch ||  || align=right | 2.5 km || 
|-id=556 bgcolor=#E9E9E9
| 569556 ||  || — || October 27, 2005 || Kitt Peak || Spacewatch ||  || align=right | 1.3 km || 
|-id=557 bgcolor=#d6d6d6
| 569557 ||  || — || October 2, 2005 || Mount Lemmon || Mount Lemmon Survey ||  || align=right | 2.4 km || 
|-id=558 bgcolor=#E9E9E9
| 569558 ||  || — || October 27, 2005 || Kitt Peak || Spacewatch ||  || align=right | 1.4 km || 
|-id=559 bgcolor=#E9E9E9
| 569559 ||  || — || October 30, 2005 || Mount Lemmon || Mount Lemmon Survey ||  || align=right data-sort-value="0.81" | 810 m || 
|-id=560 bgcolor=#d6d6d6
| 569560 ||  || — || October 11, 2005 || Kitt Peak || Spacewatch ||  || align=right | 2.2 km || 
|-id=561 bgcolor=#fefefe
| 569561 ||  || — || October 25, 2005 || Mount Lemmon || Mount Lemmon Survey || H || align=right data-sort-value="0.71" | 710 m || 
|-id=562 bgcolor=#E9E9E9
| 569562 ||  || — || October 27, 2005 || Kitt Peak || Spacewatch ||  || align=right data-sort-value="0.74" | 740 m || 
|-id=563 bgcolor=#fefefe
| 569563 ||  || — || September 29, 2005 || Mount Lemmon || Mount Lemmon Survey ||  || align=right data-sort-value="0.52" | 520 m || 
|-id=564 bgcolor=#d6d6d6
| 569564 ||  || — || October 12, 2005 || Kitt Peak || Spacewatch ||  || align=right | 2.6 km || 
|-id=565 bgcolor=#d6d6d6
| 569565 ||  || — || September 12, 2015 || Haleakala || Pan-STARRS ||  || align=right | 2.2 km || 
|-id=566 bgcolor=#d6d6d6
| 569566 ||  || — || October 25, 2005 || Kitt Peak || Spacewatch ||  || align=right | 2.8 km || 
|-id=567 bgcolor=#fefefe
| 569567 ||  || — || October 25, 2005 || Kitt Peak || Spacewatch ||  || align=right data-sort-value="0.70" | 700 m || 
|-id=568 bgcolor=#d6d6d6
| 569568 ||  || — || October 27, 2005 || Mount Lemmon || Mount Lemmon Survey ||  || align=right | 2.4 km || 
|-id=569 bgcolor=#d6d6d6
| 569569 ||  || — || October 28, 2005 || Kitt Peak || Spacewatch ||  || align=right | 2.3 km || 
|-id=570 bgcolor=#E9E9E9
| 569570 ||  || — || October 28, 2005 || Kitt Peak || Spacewatch ||  || align=right data-sort-value="0.93" | 930 m || 
|-id=571 bgcolor=#d6d6d6
| 569571 ||  || — || October 28, 2005 || Kitt Peak || Spacewatch ||  || align=right | 1.8 km || 
|-id=572 bgcolor=#E9E9E9
| 569572 ||  || — || October 28, 2005 || Kitt Peak || Spacewatch ||  || align=right | 1.1 km || 
|-id=573 bgcolor=#d6d6d6
| 569573 ||  || — || October 28, 2005 || Kitt Peak || Spacewatch ||  || align=right | 2.4 km || 
|-id=574 bgcolor=#E9E9E9
| 569574 ||  || — || March 26, 2003 || Kitt Peak || Spacewatch ||  || align=right | 1.6 km || 
|-id=575 bgcolor=#E9E9E9
| 569575 ||  || — || October 28, 2005 || Catalina || CSS ||  || align=right | 1.2 km || 
|-id=576 bgcolor=#d6d6d6
| 569576 ||  || — || October 29, 2005 || Kitt Peak || Spacewatch ||  || align=right | 2.5 km || 
|-id=577 bgcolor=#E9E9E9
| 569577 ||  || — || October 10, 2005 || Anderson Mesa || LONEOS ||  || align=right data-sort-value="0.57" | 570 m || 
|-id=578 bgcolor=#E9E9E9
| 569578 ||  || — || October 22, 2005 || Kitt Peak || Spacewatch ||  || align=right data-sort-value="0.67" | 670 m || 
|-id=579 bgcolor=#fefefe
| 569579 ||  || — || October 30, 2005 || Kitt Peak || Spacewatch ||  || align=right data-sort-value="0.61" | 610 m || 
|-id=580 bgcolor=#d6d6d6
| 569580 ||  || — || October 30, 2005 || Kitt Peak || Spacewatch ||  || align=right | 2.8 km || 
|-id=581 bgcolor=#fefefe
| 569581 ||  || — || October 30, 2005 || Kitt Peak || Spacewatch ||  || align=right data-sort-value="0.74" | 740 m || 
|-id=582 bgcolor=#d6d6d6
| 569582 ||  || — || October 30, 2005 || Kitt Peak || Spacewatch ||  || align=right | 2.4 km || 
|-id=583 bgcolor=#E9E9E9
| 569583 ||  || — || October 30, 2005 || Kitt Peak || Spacewatch ||  || align=right | 1.2 km || 
|-id=584 bgcolor=#E9E9E9
| 569584 ||  || — || September 30, 2005 || Mount Lemmon || Mount Lemmon Survey ||  || align=right | 1.0 km || 
|-id=585 bgcolor=#d6d6d6
| 569585 ||  || — || October 27, 2005 || Palomar || NEAT ||  || align=right | 2.1 km || 
|-id=586 bgcolor=#d6d6d6
| 569586 ||  || — || September 2, 2005 || Palomar || NEAT ||  || align=right | 3.6 km || 
|-id=587 bgcolor=#fefefe
| 569587 ||  || — || October 24, 2005 || Palomar || NEAT || H || align=right data-sort-value="0.66" | 660 m || 
|-id=588 bgcolor=#fefefe
| 569588 ||  || — || October 27, 2005 || Catalina || CSS ||  || align=right data-sort-value="0.70" | 700 m || 
|-id=589 bgcolor=#d6d6d6
| 569589 ||  || — || October 29, 2005 || Catalina || CSS ||  || align=right | 2.9 km || 
|-id=590 bgcolor=#fefefe
| 569590 ||  || — || October 22, 2005 || Kitt Peak || Spacewatch ||  || align=right data-sort-value="0.61" | 610 m || 
|-id=591 bgcolor=#E9E9E9
| 569591 ||  || — || January 14, 2011 || Kitt Peak || Spacewatch ||  || align=right | 1.1 km || 
|-id=592 bgcolor=#E9E9E9
| 569592 ||  || — || October 25, 2005 || Kitt Peak || Spacewatch ||  || align=right data-sort-value="0.91" | 910 m || 
|-id=593 bgcolor=#d6d6d6
| 569593 ||  || — || June 14, 2004 || Kitt Peak || Spacewatch || EOS || align=right | 1.6 km || 
|-id=594 bgcolor=#d6d6d6
| 569594 ||  || — || February 10, 2007 || Mount Lemmon || Mount Lemmon Survey || EOS || align=right | 1.5 km || 
|-id=595 bgcolor=#d6d6d6
| 569595 ||  || — || January 10, 2007 || Kitt Peak || Spacewatch ||  || align=right | 2.4 km || 
|-id=596 bgcolor=#d6d6d6
| 569596 ||  || — || January 10, 2007 || Kitt Peak || Spacewatch ||  || align=right | 2.5 km || 
|-id=597 bgcolor=#d6d6d6
| 569597 ||  || — || February 17, 2007 || Mount Lemmon || Mount Lemmon Survey ||  || align=right | 2.4 km || 
|-id=598 bgcolor=#d6d6d6
| 569598 ||  || — || October 30, 2005 || Apache Point || SDSS Collaboration ||  || align=right | 2.6 km || 
|-id=599 bgcolor=#d6d6d6
| 569599 ||  || — || October 1, 2005 || Apache Point || SDSS Collaboration ||  || align=right | 2.4 km || 
|-id=600 bgcolor=#d6d6d6
| 569600 ||  || — || October 27, 2005 || Apache Point || SDSS Collaboration ||  || align=right | 2.3 km || 
|}

569601–569700 

|-bgcolor=#E9E9E9
| 569601 ||  || — || November 1, 2005 || Catalina || CSS || BRG || align=right | 1.3 km || 
|-id=602 bgcolor=#d6d6d6
| 569602 ||  || — || October 27, 2005 || Apache Point || SDSS Collaboration ||  || align=right | 2.3 km || 
|-id=603 bgcolor=#d6d6d6
| 569603 ||  || — || October 26, 2005 || Kitt Peak || Spacewatch ||  || align=right | 2.8 km || 
|-id=604 bgcolor=#E9E9E9
| 569604 ||  || — || October 25, 2005 || Mount Lemmon || Mount Lemmon Survey ||  || align=right | 1.2 km || 
|-id=605 bgcolor=#d6d6d6
| 569605 ||  || — || September 29, 2005 || Mount Lemmon || Mount Lemmon Survey ||  || align=right | 2.3 km || 
|-id=606 bgcolor=#d6d6d6
| 569606 ||  || — || October 25, 2005 || Mount Lemmon || Mount Lemmon Survey ||  || align=right | 2.7 km || 
|-id=607 bgcolor=#fefefe
| 569607 ||  || — || October 28, 2005 || Mount Lemmon || Mount Lemmon Survey ||  || align=right data-sort-value="0.53" | 530 m || 
|-id=608 bgcolor=#E9E9E9
| 569608 ||  || — || October 25, 2005 || Kitt Peak || Spacewatch ||  || align=right data-sort-value="0.87" | 870 m || 
|-id=609 bgcolor=#d6d6d6
| 569609 ||  || — || October 28, 2005 || Kitt Peak || Spacewatch ||  || align=right | 3.0 km || 
|-id=610 bgcolor=#E9E9E9
| 569610 ||  || — || October 29, 2005 || Kitt Peak || Spacewatch ||  || align=right | 1.4 km || 
|-id=611 bgcolor=#E9E9E9
| 569611 ||  || — || March 30, 2003 || Kitt Peak || M. W. Buie, A. B. Jordan ||  || align=right | 1.3 km || 
|-id=612 bgcolor=#fefefe
| 569612 ||  || — || January 28, 2011 || Mount Lemmon || Mount Lemmon Survey ||  || align=right | 1.0 km || 
|-id=613 bgcolor=#fefefe
| 569613 ||  || — || October 22, 2005 || Kitt Peak || Spacewatch ||  || align=right data-sort-value="0.75" | 750 m || 
|-id=614 bgcolor=#d6d6d6
| 569614 ||  || — || July 27, 2015 || Haleakala || Pan-STARRS ||  || align=right | 2.4 km || 
|-id=615 bgcolor=#fefefe
| 569615 ||  || — || February 17, 2010 || Mount Lemmon || Mount Lemmon Survey ||  || align=right data-sort-value="0.62" | 620 m || 
|-id=616 bgcolor=#d6d6d6
| 569616 ||  || — || October 25, 2005 || Kitt Peak || Spacewatch ||  || align=right | 2.3 km || 
|-id=617 bgcolor=#fefefe
| 569617 ||  || — || November 12, 2012 || Mount Lemmon || Mount Lemmon Survey ||  || align=right data-sort-value="0.62" | 620 m || 
|-id=618 bgcolor=#d6d6d6
| 569618 ||  || — || April 1, 2014 || Mount Lemmon || Mount Lemmon Survey ||  || align=right | 2.3 km || 
|-id=619 bgcolor=#fefefe
| 569619 ||  || — || March 10, 2011 || Kitt Peak || Spacewatch ||  || align=right data-sort-value="0.85" | 850 m || 
|-id=620 bgcolor=#E9E9E9
| 569620 ||  || — || August 16, 2009 || Bergisch Gladbach || W. Bickel ||  || align=right | 1.5 km || 
|-id=621 bgcolor=#E9E9E9
| 569621 ||  || — || October 27, 2005 || Mount Lemmon || Mount Lemmon Survey ||  || align=right | 1.3 km || 
|-id=622 bgcolor=#E9E9E9
| 569622 ||  || — || October 14, 2009 || Catalina || CSS ||  || align=right data-sort-value="0.77" | 770 m || 
|-id=623 bgcolor=#fefefe
| 569623 ||  || — || July 25, 2011 || Haleakala || Pan-STARRS ||  || align=right data-sort-value="0.54" | 540 m || 
|-id=624 bgcolor=#E9E9E9
| 569624 ||  || — || September 21, 2009 || Mount Lemmon || Mount Lemmon Survey ||  || align=right | 1.1 km || 
|-id=625 bgcolor=#E9E9E9
| 569625 ||  || — || October 29, 2005 || Catalina || CSS ||  || align=right | 1.3 km || 
|-id=626 bgcolor=#fefefe
| 569626 ||  || — || October 25, 2005 || Mount Lemmon || Mount Lemmon Survey ||  || align=right data-sort-value="0.56" | 560 m || 
|-id=627 bgcolor=#E9E9E9
| 569627 ||  || — || October 24, 2005 || Mauna Kea || Mauna Kea Obs. ||  || align=right | 2.4 km || 
|-id=628 bgcolor=#d6d6d6
| 569628 ||  || — || May 24, 2014 || Haleakala || Pan-STARRS ||  || align=right | 2.2 km || 
|-id=629 bgcolor=#d6d6d6
| 569629 ||  || — || October 24, 2011 || Haleakala || Pan-STARRS ||  || align=right | 2.2 km || 
|-id=630 bgcolor=#E9E9E9
| 569630 ||  || — || March 20, 2007 || Catalina || CSS ||  || align=right | 1.5 km || 
|-id=631 bgcolor=#d6d6d6
| 569631 ||  || — || March 28, 2008 || Mount Lemmon || Mount Lemmon Survey ||  || align=right | 2.1 km || 
|-id=632 bgcolor=#d6d6d6
| 569632 ||  || — || March 6, 2008 || Mount Lemmon || Mount Lemmon Survey ||  || align=right | 2.5 km || 
|-id=633 bgcolor=#d6d6d6
| 569633 ||  || — || September 11, 2010 || Mount Lemmon || Mount Lemmon Survey ||  || align=right | 2.4 km || 
|-id=634 bgcolor=#E9E9E9
| 569634 ||  || — || October 27, 2005 || Kitt Peak || Spacewatch ||  || align=right | 1.4 km || 
|-id=635 bgcolor=#E9E9E9
| 569635 ||  || — || October 25, 2005 || Mount Lemmon || Mount Lemmon Survey ||  || align=right data-sort-value="0.88" | 880 m || 
|-id=636 bgcolor=#d6d6d6
| 569636 ||  || — || October 22, 2005 || Kitt Peak || Spacewatch ||  || align=right | 2.2 km || 
|-id=637 bgcolor=#d6d6d6
| 569637 ||  || — || October 31, 2005 || Mount Lemmon || Mount Lemmon Survey ||  || align=right | 2.4 km || 
|-id=638 bgcolor=#d6d6d6
| 569638 ||  || — || October 27, 2005 || Kitt Peak || Spacewatch ||  || align=right | 2.5 km || 
|-id=639 bgcolor=#d6d6d6
| 569639 ||  || — || October 29, 2005 || Mount Lemmon || Mount Lemmon Survey ||  || align=right | 2.4 km || 
|-id=640 bgcolor=#E9E9E9
| 569640 ||  || — || October 27, 2005 || Kitt Peak || Spacewatch ||  || align=right | 1.3 km || 
|-id=641 bgcolor=#fefefe
| 569641 ||  || — || November 6, 2005 || Pla D'Arguines || R. Ferrando, M. Ferrando ||  || align=right data-sort-value="0.94" | 940 m || 
|-id=642 bgcolor=#d6d6d6
| 569642 ||  || — || November 1, 2005 || Kitt Peak || Spacewatch ||  || align=right | 2.4 km || 
|-id=643 bgcolor=#fefefe
| 569643 ||  || — || October 26, 2005 || Anderson Mesa || LONEOS ||  || align=right data-sort-value="0.69" | 690 m || 
|-id=644 bgcolor=#d6d6d6
| 569644 ||  || — || October 27, 2005 || Kitt Peak || Spacewatch ||  || align=right | 2.8 km || 
|-id=645 bgcolor=#d6d6d6
| 569645 ||  || — || November 1, 2005 || Kitt Peak || Spacewatch ||  || align=right | 2.8 km || 
|-id=646 bgcolor=#d6d6d6
| 569646 ||  || — || October 24, 2005 || Kitt Peak || Spacewatch ||  || align=right | 2.0 km || 
|-id=647 bgcolor=#d6d6d6
| 569647 ||  || — || November 4, 2005 || Kitt Peak || Spacewatch ||  || align=right | 2.8 km || 
|-id=648 bgcolor=#fefefe
| 569648 ||  || — || November 4, 2005 || Kitt Peak || Spacewatch ||  || align=right data-sort-value="0.66" | 660 m || 
|-id=649 bgcolor=#E9E9E9
| 569649 ||  || — || October 25, 2005 || Mount Lemmon || Mount Lemmon Survey ||  || align=right | 1.5 km || 
|-id=650 bgcolor=#E9E9E9
| 569650 ||  || — || November 3, 2005 || Mount Lemmon || Mount Lemmon Survey ||  || align=right data-sort-value="0.91" | 910 m || 
|-id=651 bgcolor=#d6d6d6
| 569651 ||  || — || November 4, 2005 || Kitt Peak || Spacewatch ||  || align=right | 2.7 km || 
|-id=652 bgcolor=#d6d6d6
| 569652 ||  || — || September 2, 2005 || Palomar || NEAT ||  || align=right | 3.6 km || 
|-id=653 bgcolor=#d6d6d6
| 569653 ||  || — || November 4, 2005 || Mount Lemmon || Mount Lemmon Survey ||  || align=right | 3.2 km || 
|-id=654 bgcolor=#d6d6d6
| 569654 ||  || — || November 5, 2005 || Kitt Peak || Spacewatch ||  || align=right | 2.3 km || 
|-id=655 bgcolor=#d6d6d6
| 569655 ||  || — || September 1, 2005 || Kitt Peak || Spacewatch ||  || align=right | 2.7 km || 
|-id=656 bgcolor=#E9E9E9
| 569656 ||  || — || November 4, 2005 || Kitt Peak || Spacewatch ||  || align=right | 1.5 km || 
|-id=657 bgcolor=#d6d6d6
| 569657 ||  || — || November 4, 2005 || Kitt Peak || Spacewatch ||  || align=right | 2.2 km || 
|-id=658 bgcolor=#E9E9E9
| 569658 ||  || — || October 25, 2005 || Kitt Peak || Spacewatch ||  || align=right | 1.3 km || 
|-id=659 bgcolor=#d6d6d6
| 569659 ||  || — || November 6, 2005 || Socorro || LINEAR ||  || align=right | 3.0 km || 
|-id=660 bgcolor=#fefefe
| 569660 ||  || — || October 25, 2005 || Catalina || CSS ||  || align=right data-sort-value="0.76" | 760 m || 
|-id=661 bgcolor=#fefefe
| 569661 ||  || — || November 3, 2005 || Kitt Peak || Spacewatch ||  || align=right data-sort-value="0.65" | 650 m || 
|-id=662 bgcolor=#fefefe
| 569662 ||  || — || November 4, 2005 || Kitt Peak || Spacewatch ||  || align=right data-sort-value="0.63" | 630 m || 
|-id=663 bgcolor=#E9E9E9
| 569663 ||  || — || October 26, 2005 || Kitt Peak || Spacewatch ||  || align=right | 1.6 km || 
|-id=664 bgcolor=#d6d6d6
| 569664 ||  || — || November 6, 2005 || Kitt Peak || Spacewatch ||  || align=right | 2.2 km || 
|-id=665 bgcolor=#fefefe
| 569665 ||  || — || October 25, 2005 || Catalina || CSS || H || align=right data-sort-value="0.62" | 620 m || 
|-id=666 bgcolor=#d6d6d6
| 569666 ||  || — || August 31, 2005 || Palomar || NEAT ||  || align=right | 2.9 km || 
|-id=667 bgcolor=#fefefe
| 569667 ||  || — || October 29, 2005 || Catalina || CSS ||  || align=right data-sort-value="0.53" | 530 m || 
|-id=668 bgcolor=#d6d6d6
| 569668 ||  || — || November 11, 2005 || Kitt Peak || Spacewatch || 7:4 || align=right | 3.2 km || 
|-id=669 bgcolor=#E9E9E9
| 569669 ||  || — || November 11, 2005 || Kitt Peak || Spacewatch ||  || align=right | 1.6 km || 
|-id=670 bgcolor=#d6d6d6
| 569670 ||  || — || October 27, 2005 || Apache Point || SDSS Collaboration ||  || align=right | 2.3 km || 
|-id=671 bgcolor=#fefefe
| 569671 ||  || — || October 1, 2005 || Mount Lemmon || Mount Lemmon Survey ||  || align=right data-sort-value="0.47" | 470 m || 
|-id=672 bgcolor=#d6d6d6
| 569672 ||  || — || October 27, 2005 || Apache Point || SDSS Collaboration ||  || align=right | 1.7 km || 
|-id=673 bgcolor=#E9E9E9
| 569673 ||  || — || December 1, 2005 || Mount Lemmon || Mount Lemmon Survey ||  || align=right | 1.0 km || 
|-id=674 bgcolor=#d6d6d6
| 569674 ||  || — || October 23, 2005 || Apache Point || SDSS Collaboration ||  || align=right | 3.0 km || 
|-id=675 bgcolor=#d6d6d6
| 569675 ||  || — || September 29, 2005 || Kitt Peak || Spacewatch ||  || align=right | 1.9 km || 
|-id=676 bgcolor=#d6d6d6
| 569676 ||  || — || October 30, 2005 || Apache Point || SDSS Collaboration ||  || align=right | 2.9 km || 
|-id=677 bgcolor=#d6d6d6
| 569677 ||  || — || October 26, 2005 || Apache Point || SDSS Collaboration ||  || align=right | 2.8 km || 
|-id=678 bgcolor=#E9E9E9
| 569678 ||  || — || November 7, 2005 || Mauna Kea || Mauna Kea Obs. ||  || align=right | 1.7 km || 
|-id=679 bgcolor=#fefefe
| 569679 ||  || — || April 20, 2007 || Kitt Peak || Spacewatch ||  || align=right data-sort-value="0.74" | 740 m || 
|-id=680 bgcolor=#fefefe
| 569680 ||  || — || August 24, 2008 || Kitt Peak || Spacewatch ||  || align=right data-sort-value="0.67" | 670 m || 
|-id=681 bgcolor=#d6d6d6
| 569681 ||  || — || October 1, 2010 || Mount Lemmon || Mount Lemmon Survey ||  || align=right | 2.7 km || 
|-id=682 bgcolor=#fefefe
| 569682 ||  || — || October 9, 2015 || Haleakala || Pan-STARRS ||  || align=right data-sort-value="0.58" | 580 m || 
|-id=683 bgcolor=#d6d6d6
| 569683 ||  || — || November 1, 2005 || Mount Lemmon || Mount Lemmon Survey ||  || align=right | 2.2 km || 
|-id=684 bgcolor=#d6d6d6
| 569684 ||  || — || April 4, 2008 || Mount Lemmon || Mount Lemmon Survey ||  || align=right | 2.8 km || 
|-id=685 bgcolor=#d6d6d6
| 569685 ||  || — || December 28, 2011 || Mount Lemmon || Mount Lemmon Survey ||  || align=right | 2.5 km || 
|-id=686 bgcolor=#d6d6d6
| 569686 ||  || — || September 19, 2010 || Kitt Peak || Spacewatch ||  || align=right | 2.2 km || 
|-id=687 bgcolor=#d6d6d6
| 569687 ||  || — || April 29, 2014 || Haleakala || Pan-STARRS ||  || align=right | 2.7 km || 
|-id=688 bgcolor=#E9E9E9
| 569688 ||  || — || November 1, 2005 || Kitt Peak || Spacewatch ||  || align=right | 1.0 km || 
|-id=689 bgcolor=#E9E9E9
| 569689 ||  || — || November 3, 2005 || Mount Lemmon || Mount Lemmon Survey ||  || align=right | 1.2 km || 
|-id=690 bgcolor=#d6d6d6
| 569690 ||  || — || September 5, 2010 || Mount Lemmon || Mount Lemmon Survey ||  || align=right | 3.0 km || 
|-id=691 bgcolor=#E9E9E9
| 569691 ||  || — || November 12, 2005 || Kitt Peak || Spacewatch ||  || align=right | 1.5 km || 
|-id=692 bgcolor=#d6d6d6
| 569692 ||  || — || March 22, 2014 || Calar Alto || Calar Alto Obs. ||  || align=right | 2.4 km || 
|-id=693 bgcolor=#d6d6d6
| 569693 ||  || — || May 4, 2014 || Haleakala || Pan-STARRS ||  || align=right | 2.5 km || 
|-id=694 bgcolor=#fefefe
| 569694 ||  || — || November 6, 2005 || Mount Lemmon || Mount Lemmon Survey ||  || align=right data-sort-value="0.71" | 710 m || 
|-id=695 bgcolor=#E9E9E9
| 569695 ||  || — || November 7, 2005 || Mauna Kea || Mauna Kea Obs. ||  || align=right | 2.0 km || 
|-id=696 bgcolor=#d6d6d6
| 569696 ||  || — || November 3, 2005 || Kitt Peak || Spacewatch ||  || align=right | 2.6 km || 
|-id=697 bgcolor=#d6d6d6
| 569697 ||  || — || November 12, 2005 || Kitt Peak || Spacewatch ||  || align=right | 2.6 km || 
|-id=698 bgcolor=#fefefe
| 569698 ||  || — || November 6, 2005 || Mount Lemmon || Mount Lemmon Survey ||  || align=right data-sort-value="0.57" | 570 m || 
|-id=699 bgcolor=#fefefe
| 569699 ||  || — || November 6, 2005 || Mount Lemmon || Mount Lemmon Survey ||  || align=right data-sort-value="0.47" | 470 m || 
|-id=700 bgcolor=#d6d6d6
| 569700 ||  || — || November 1, 2005 || Mount Lemmon || Mount Lemmon Survey ||  || align=right | 2.4 km || 
|}

569701–569800 

|-bgcolor=#E9E9E9
| 569701 ||  || — || November 12, 2005 || Kitt Peak || Spacewatch ||  || align=right | 1.2 km || 
|-id=702 bgcolor=#E9E9E9
| 569702 ||  || — || November 4, 2005 || Kitt Peak || Spacewatch ||  || align=right | 1.5 km || 
|-id=703 bgcolor=#d6d6d6
| 569703 ||  || — || October 28, 2005 || Mount Lemmon || Mount Lemmon Survey ||  || align=right | 2.7 km || 
|-id=704 bgcolor=#d6d6d6
| 569704 ||  || — || November 21, 2005 || Kitt Peak || Spacewatch || 7:4* || align=right | 2.6 km || 
|-id=705 bgcolor=#fefefe
| 569705 ||  || — || November 12, 2005 || Kitt Peak || Spacewatch ||  || align=right data-sort-value="0.75" | 750 m || 
|-id=706 bgcolor=#d6d6d6
| 569706 ||  || — || November 22, 2005 || Kitt Peak || Spacewatch ||  || align=right | 3.3 km || 
|-id=707 bgcolor=#d6d6d6
| 569707 ||  || — || November 3, 2005 || Kitt Peak || Spacewatch ||  || align=right | 3.0 km || 
|-id=708 bgcolor=#d6d6d6
| 569708 ||  || — || October 27, 2005 || Mount Lemmon || Mount Lemmon Survey ||  || align=right | 3.6 km || 
|-id=709 bgcolor=#E9E9E9
| 569709 ||  || — || October 25, 2005 || Mount Lemmon || Mount Lemmon Survey ||  || align=right | 1.2 km || 
|-id=710 bgcolor=#d6d6d6
| 569710 ||  || — || November 10, 2005 || Mount Lemmon || Mount Lemmon Survey ||  || align=right | 2.4 km || 
|-id=711 bgcolor=#fefefe
| 569711 ||  || — || October 28, 2005 || Mount Lemmon || Mount Lemmon Survey ||  || align=right data-sort-value="0.63" | 630 m || 
|-id=712 bgcolor=#d6d6d6
| 569712 ||  || — || October 30, 2005 || Mount Lemmon || Mount Lemmon Survey || 7:4 || align=right | 3.4 km || 
|-id=713 bgcolor=#d6d6d6
| 569713 ||  || — || October 27, 2005 || Mount Lemmon || Mount Lemmon Survey ||  || align=right | 2.7 km || 
|-id=714 bgcolor=#E9E9E9
| 569714 ||  || — || November 21, 2005 || Kitt Peak || Spacewatch ||  || align=right | 1.2 km || 
|-id=715 bgcolor=#E9E9E9
| 569715 ||  || — || October 30, 2005 || Kitt Peak || Spacewatch ||  || align=right data-sort-value="0.64" | 640 m || 
|-id=716 bgcolor=#E9E9E9
| 569716 ||  || — || November 25, 2005 || Mount Lemmon || Mount Lemmon Survey ||  || align=right | 1.4 km || 
|-id=717 bgcolor=#E9E9E9
| 569717 ||  || — || November 25, 2005 || Mount Lemmon || Mount Lemmon Survey ||  || align=right | 1.7 km || 
|-id=718 bgcolor=#E9E9E9
| 569718 ||  || — || November 4, 2005 || Kitt Peak || Spacewatch ||  || align=right | 1.4 km || 
|-id=719 bgcolor=#E9E9E9
| 569719 ||  || — || November 25, 2005 || Kitt Peak || Spacewatch ||  || align=right | 1.3 km || 
|-id=720 bgcolor=#E9E9E9
| 569720 ||  || — || November 25, 2005 || Great Shefford || P. Birtwhistle ||  || align=right | 1.3 km || 
|-id=721 bgcolor=#E9E9E9
| 569721 ||  || — || November 25, 2005 || Kitt Peak || Spacewatch ||  || align=right | 1.7 km || 
|-id=722 bgcolor=#E9E9E9
| 569722 ||  || — || November 25, 2005 || Kitt Peak || Spacewatch ||  || align=right | 2.0 km || 
|-id=723 bgcolor=#E9E9E9
| 569723 ||  || — || August 26, 2000 || Cerro Tololo || R. Millis, L. H. Wasserman ||  || align=right | 1.1 km || 
|-id=724 bgcolor=#d6d6d6
| 569724 ||  || — || November 6, 2005 || Kitt Peak || Spacewatch ||  || align=right | 2.8 km || 
|-id=725 bgcolor=#fefefe
| 569725 ||  || — || November 25, 2005 || Kitt Peak || Spacewatch ||  || align=right data-sort-value="0.74" | 740 m || 
|-id=726 bgcolor=#fefefe
| 569726 ||  || — || January 26, 2003 || Palomar || NEAT ||  || align=right data-sort-value="0.78" | 780 m || 
|-id=727 bgcolor=#d6d6d6
| 569727 ||  || — || October 25, 2005 || Mount Lemmon || Mount Lemmon Survey ||  || align=right | 2.4 km || 
|-id=728 bgcolor=#d6d6d6
| 569728 ||  || — || November 22, 2005 || Kitt Peak || Spacewatch ||  || align=right | 3.1 km || 
|-id=729 bgcolor=#E9E9E9
| 569729 ||  || — || October 25, 2005 || Anderson Mesa || LONEOS ||  || align=right | 2.0 km || 
|-id=730 bgcolor=#E9E9E9
| 569730 ||  || — || November 25, 2005 || Mount Lemmon || Mount Lemmon Survey ||  || align=right | 1.6 km || 
|-id=731 bgcolor=#E9E9E9
| 569731 ||  || — || November 26, 2005 || Kitt Peak || Spacewatch ||  || align=right | 1.3 km || 
|-id=732 bgcolor=#d6d6d6
| 569732 ||  || — || November 10, 2005 || Mount Lemmon || Mount Lemmon Survey ||  || align=right | 2.5 km || 
|-id=733 bgcolor=#E9E9E9
| 569733 ||  || — || November 30, 2005 || Kitt Peak || Spacewatch ||  || align=right | 1.2 km || 
|-id=734 bgcolor=#d6d6d6
| 569734 ||  || — || November 22, 2005 || Kitt Peak || Spacewatch ||  || align=right | 2.6 km || 
|-id=735 bgcolor=#d6d6d6
| 569735 ||  || — || October 1, 2005 || Catalina || CSS ||  || align=right | 3.1 km || 
|-id=736 bgcolor=#E9E9E9
| 569736 ||  || — || November 25, 2005 || Mount Lemmon || Mount Lemmon Survey ||  || align=right data-sort-value="0.88" | 880 m || 
|-id=737 bgcolor=#E9E9E9
| 569737 ||  || — || November 25, 2005 || Mount Lemmon || Mount Lemmon Survey ||  || align=right data-sort-value="0.96" | 960 m || 
|-id=738 bgcolor=#d6d6d6
| 569738 ||  || — || November 26, 2005 || Mount Lemmon || Mount Lemmon Survey ||  || align=right | 1.9 km || 
|-id=739 bgcolor=#E9E9E9
| 569739 ||  || — || November 28, 2005 || Mount Lemmon || Mount Lemmon Survey ||  || align=right | 1.7 km || 
|-id=740 bgcolor=#E9E9E9
| 569740 ||  || — || November 25, 2005 || Kitt Peak || Spacewatch ||  || align=right | 1.2 km || 
|-id=741 bgcolor=#d6d6d6
| 569741 ||  || — || October 11, 2005 || Uccle || P. De Cat ||  || align=right | 3.3 km || 
|-id=742 bgcolor=#E9E9E9
| 569742 ||  || — || November 28, 2005 || Kitt Peak || Spacewatch ||  || align=right | 1.4 km || 
|-id=743 bgcolor=#fefefe
| 569743 ||  || — || November 29, 2005 || Kitt Peak || Spacewatch ||  || align=right data-sort-value="0.57" | 570 m || 
|-id=744 bgcolor=#d6d6d6
| 569744 ||  || — || November 29, 2005 || Kitt Peak || Spacewatch ||  || align=right | 2.6 km || 
|-id=745 bgcolor=#fefefe
| 569745 ||  || — || November 29, 2005 || Kitt Peak || Spacewatch ||  || align=right data-sort-value="0.62" | 620 m || 
|-id=746 bgcolor=#E9E9E9
| 569746 ||  || — || November 5, 2005 || Mount Lemmon || Mount Lemmon Survey ||  || align=right | 1.2 km || 
|-id=747 bgcolor=#E9E9E9
| 569747 ||  || — || November 30, 2005 || Kitt Peak || Spacewatch ||  || align=right data-sort-value="0.83" | 830 m || 
|-id=748 bgcolor=#d6d6d6
| 569748 ||  || — || October 25, 2005 || Mount Lemmon || Mount Lemmon Survey ||  || align=right | 2.4 km || 
|-id=749 bgcolor=#d6d6d6
| 569749 ||  || — || November 25, 2005 || Catalina || CSS ||  || align=right | 3.2 km || 
|-id=750 bgcolor=#E9E9E9
| 569750 ||  || — || November 20, 2005 || Palomar || NEAT ||  || align=right | 1.7 km || 
|-id=751 bgcolor=#d6d6d6
| 569751 ||  || — || November 28, 2005 || Palomar || NEAT ||  || align=right | 2.2 km || 
|-id=752 bgcolor=#d6d6d6
| 569752 ||  || — || November 25, 2005 || Kitt Peak || Spacewatch ||  || align=right | 2.5 km || 
|-id=753 bgcolor=#E9E9E9
| 569753 ||  || — || November 26, 2005 || Kitt Peak || Spacewatch ||  || align=right | 1.4 km || 
|-id=754 bgcolor=#fefefe
| 569754 ||  || — || November 26, 2005 || Kitt Peak || Spacewatch ||  || align=right data-sort-value="0.72" | 720 m || 
|-id=755 bgcolor=#E9E9E9
| 569755 ||  || — || November 26, 2005 || Kitt Peak || Spacewatch ||  || align=right | 1.7 km || 
|-id=756 bgcolor=#E9E9E9
| 569756 ||  || — || November 26, 2005 || Kitt Peak || Spacewatch ||  || align=right data-sort-value="0.56" | 560 m || 
|-id=757 bgcolor=#E9E9E9
| 569757 ||  || — || November 29, 2005 || Kitt Peak || Spacewatch ||  || align=right | 1.4 km || 
|-id=758 bgcolor=#fefefe
| 569758 ||  || — || January 29, 2003 || Apache Point || SDSS Collaboration ||  || align=right data-sort-value="0.60" | 600 m || 
|-id=759 bgcolor=#E9E9E9
| 569759 ||  || — || November 29, 2005 || Kitt Peak || Spacewatch ||  || align=right data-sort-value="0.81" | 810 m || 
|-id=760 bgcolor=#E9E9E9
| 569760 ||  || — || October 27, 2005 || Catalina || CSS || JUN || align=right data-sort-value="0.81" | 810 m || 
|-id=761 bgcolor=#d6d6d6
| 569761 ||  || — || October 25, 2005 || Kitt Peak || Spacewatch ||  || align=right | 2.2 km || 
|-id=762 bgcolor=#d6d6d6
| 569762 ||  || — || November 26, 2005 || Kitt Peak || Spacewatch ||  || align=right | 1.9 km || 
|-id=763 bgcolor=#E9E9E9
| 569763 ||  || — || November 28, 2005 || Mount Lemmon || Mount Lemmon Survey ||  || align=right | 1.3 km || 
|-id=764 bgcolor=#fefefe
| 569764 ||  || — || November 29, 2005 || Kitt Peak || Spacewatch ||  || align=right data-sort-value="0.64" | 640 m || 
|-id=765 bgcolor=#d6d6d6
| 569765 ||  || — || November 28, 2005 || Kitt Peak || Spacewatch ||  || align=right | 2.3 km || 
|-id=766 bgcolor=#d6d6d6
| 569766 ||  || — || November 21, 2017 || Haleakala || Pan-STARRS ||  || align=right | 2.6 km || 
|-id=767 bgcolor=#d6d6d6
| 569767 ||  || — || November 30, 2005 || Mount Lemmon || Mount Lemmon Survey ||  || align=right | 2.5 km || 
|-id=768 bgcolor=#E9E9E9
| 569768 ||  || — || January 17, 2015 || Haleakala || Pan-STARRS ||  || align=right | 1.3 km || 
|-id=769 bgcolor=#d6d6d6
| 569769 ||  || — || March 4, 2013 || Haleakala || Pan-STARRS ||  || align=right | 2.5 km || 
|-id=770 bgcolor=#d6d6d6
| 569770 ||  || — || November 15, 1995 || Kitt Peak || Spacewatch ||  || align=right | 2.5 km || 
|-id=771 bgcolor=#d6d6d6
| 569771 ||  || — || November 9, 2005 || Catalina || CSS ||  || align=right | 2.5 km || 
|-id=772 bgcolor=#d6d6d6
| 569772 ||  || — || November 21, 2005 || Kitt Peak || Spacewatch ||  || align=right | 2.9 km || 
|-id=773 bgcolor=#E9E9E9
| 569773 ||  || — || December 7, 2005 || Catalina || CSS ||  || align=right data-sort-value="0.97" | 970 m || 
|-id=774 bgcolor=#E9E9E9
| 569774 ||  || — || December 1, 2005 || Kitt Peak || Spacewatch ||  || align=right | 1.3 km || 
|-id=775 bgcolor=#d6d6d6
| 569775 ||  || — || December 1, 2005 || Kitt Peak || Spacewatch ||  || align=right | 2.8 km || 
|-id=776 bgcolor=#E9E9E9
| 569776 ||  || — || December 1, 2005 || Kitt Peak || Spacewatch ||  || align=right | 2.3 km || 
|-id=777 bgcolor=#E9E9E9
| 569777 ||  || — || December 1, 2005 || Kitt Peak || Spacewatch ||  || align=right | 2.3 km || 
|-id=778 bgcolor=#d6d6d6
| 569778 ||  || — || October 5, 2005 || Kitt Peak || Spacewatch ||  || align=right | 3.0 km || 
|-id=779 bgcolor=#d6d6d6
| 569779 ||  || — || December 2, 2005 || Mount Lemmon || Mount Lemmon Survey ||  || align=right | 3.1 km || 
|-id=780 bgcolor=#d6d6d6
| 569780 ||  || — || December 1, 2005 || Kitt Peak || Spacewatch ||  || align=right | 2.1 km || 
|-id=781 bgcolor=#d6d6d6
| 569781 ||  || — || November 26, 2005 || Kitt Peak || Spacewatch ||  || align=right | 3.2 km || 
|-id=782 bgcolor=#d6d6d6
| 569782 ||  || — || December 4, 2005 || Kitt Peak || Spacewatch ||  || align=right | 2.2 km || 
|-id=783 bgcolor=#fefefe
| 569783 ||  || — || December 5, 2005 || Kitt Peak || Spacewatch ||  || align=right data-sort-value="0.65" | 650 m || 
|-id=784 bgcolor=#E9E9E9
| 569784 ||  || — || November 6, 2005 || Mount Lemmon || Mount Lemmon Survey ||  || align=right | 1.2 km || 
|-id=785 bgcolor=#fefefe
| 569785 ||  || — || December 2, 2005 || Kitt Peak || Spacewatch ||  || align=right data-sort-value="0.57" | 570 m || 
|-id=786 bgcolor=#E9E9E9
| 569786 ||  || — || December 2, 2005 || Kitt Peak || Spacewatch ||  || align=right | 1.8 km || 
|-id=787 bgcolor=#fefefe
| 569787 ||  || — || December 2, 2005 || Kitt Peak || Spacewatch ||  || align=right data-sort-value="0.64" | 640 m || 
|-id=788 bgcolor=#d6d6d6
| 569788 ||  || — || November 25, 2005 || Kitt Peak || Spacewatch ||  || align=right | 1.9 km || 
|-id=789 bgcolor=#E9E9E9
| 569789 ||  || — || December 2, 2005 || Mount Lemmon || Mount Lemmon Survey ||  || align=right | 1.3 km || 
|-id=790 bgcolor=#E9E9E9
| 569790 ||  || — || December 3, 2005 || Kitt Peak || Spacewatch ||  || align=right | 2.3 km || 
|-id=791 bgcolor=#fefefe
| 569791 ||  || — || November 10, 2005 || Mount Lemmon || Mount Lemmon Survey ||  || align=right data-sort-value="0.71" | 710 m || 
|-id=792 bgcolor=#fefefe
| 569792 ||  || — || December 5, 2005 || Mount Lemmon || Mount Lemmon Survey || H || align=right data-sort-value="0.59" | 590 m || 
|-id=793 bgcolor=#fefefe
| 569793 ||  || — || December 6, 2005 || Kitt Peak || Spacewatch ||  || align=right data-sort-value="0.65" | 650 m || 
|-id=794 bgcolor=#E9E9E9
| 569794 ||  || — || December 6, 2005 || Kitt Peak || Spacewatch ||  || align=right | 1.0 km || 
|-id=795 bgcolor=#E9E9E9
| 569795 ||  || — || December 6, 2005 || Kitt Peak || Spacewatch ||  || align=right | 1.1 km || 
|-id=796 bgcolor=#d6d6d6
| 569796 ||  || — || December 6, 2005 || Kitt Peak || Spacewatch ||  || align=right | 3.2 km || 
|-id=797 bgcolor=#E9E9E9
| 569797 ||  || — || December 2, 2005 || Kitt Peak || Spacewatch ||  || align=right data-sort-value="0.71" | 710 m || 
|-id=798 bgcolor=#fefefe
| 569798 ||  || — || December 6, 2005 || Kitt Peak || Spacewatch ||  || align=right data-sort-value="0.91" | 910 m || 
|-id=799 bgcolor=#E9E9E9
| 569799 ||  || — || December 8, 2005 || Kitt Peak || Spacewatch ||  || align=right | 1.8 km || 
|-id=800 bgcolor=#d6d6d6
| 569800 ||  || — || December 2, 2005 || Catalina || CSS ||  || align=right | 3.9 km || 
|}

569801–569900 

|-bgcolor=#d6d6d6
| 569801 ||  || — || December 1, 2005 || Kitt Peak || L. H. Wasserman, R. Millis ||  || align=right | 2.7 km || 
|-id=802 bgcolor=#d6d6d6
| 569802 ||  || — || August 30, 2005 || Kitt Peak || Spacewatch || 3:2 || align=right | 3.9 km || 
|-id=803 bgcolor=#fefefe
| 569803 ||  || — || December 1, 2005 || Kitt Peak || L. H. Wasserman, R. Millis ||  || align=right data-sort-value="0.58" | 580 m || 
|-id=804 bgcolor=#E9E9E9
| 569804 ||  || — || October 28, 2005 || Kitt Peak || Spacewatch ||  || align=right data-sort-value="0.92" | 920 m || 
|-id=805 bgcolor=#E9E9E9
| 569805 ||  || — || November 11, 2005 || Kitt Peak || Spacewatch ||  || align=right | 1.5 km || 
|-id=806 bgcolor=#E9E9E9
| 569806 ||  || — || December 6, 2005 || Mount Lemmon || Mount Lemmon Survey ||  || align=right | 2.5 km || 
|-id=807 bgcolor=#d6d6d6
| 569807 ||  || — || November 12, 2005 || Kitt Peak || Spacewatch ||  || align=right | 3.0 km || 
|-id=808 bgcolor=#E9E9E9
| 569808 ||  || — || December 3, 2005 || Mauna Kea || Mauna Kea Obs. ||  || align=right | 1.8 km || 
|-id=809 bgcolor=#E9E9E9
| 569809 ||  || — || December 6, 2005 || Kitt Peak || Spacewatch ||  || align=right data-sort-value="0.81" | 810 m || 
|-id=810 bgcolor=#E9E9E9
| 569810 ||  || — || December 4, 2005 || Kitt Peak || Spacewatch || JUN || align=right | 1.4 km || 
|-id=811 bgcolor=#E9E9E9
| 569811 ||  || — || March 9, 2011 || Mount Lemmon || Mount Lemmon Survey ||  || align=right | 1.5 km || 
|-id=812 bgcolor=#d6d6d6
| 569812 ||  || — || December 7, 2005 || Kitt Peak || Spacewatch ||  || align=right | 3.4 km || 
|-id=813 bgcolor=#E9E9E9
| 569813 ||  || — || July 14, 2013 || Haleakala || Pan-STARRS ||  || align=right data-sort-value="0.84" | 840 m || 
|-id=814 bgcolor=#E9E9E9
| 569814 ||  || — || December 1, 2005 || Mount Lemmon || Mount Lemmon Survey ||  || align=right | 1.8 km || 
|-id=815 bgcolor=#fefefe
| 569815 ||  || — || October 6, 2008 || Mount Lemmon || Mount Lemmon Survey ||  || align=right data-sort-value="0.58" | 580 m || 
|-id=816 bgcolor=#fefefe
| 569816 ||  || — || January 5, 2013 || Kitt Peak || Spacewatch ||  || align=right data-sort-value="0.68" | 680 m || 
|-id=817 bgcolor=#d6d6d6
| 569817 ||  || — || December 6, 2005 || Kitt Peak || Spacewatch ||  || align=right | 2.6 km || 
|-id=818 bgcolor=#fefefe
| 569818 ||  || — || March 16, 2007 || Kitt Peak || Spacewatch ||  || align=right data-sort-value="0.76" | 760 m || 
|-id=819 bgcolor=#E9E9E9
| 569819 ||  || — || November 26, 2009 || Kitt Peak || Spacewatch ||  || align=right data-sort-value="0.69" | 690 m || 
|-id=820 bgcolor=#d6d6d6
| 569820 ||  || — || November 13, 2010 || Mount Lemmon || Mount Lemmon Survey ||  || align=right | 2.4 km || 
|-id=821 bgcolor=#E9E9E9
| 569821 ||  || — || November 9, 2009 || Kitt Peak || Spacewatch ||  || align=right | 1.7 km || 
|-id=822 bgcolor=#E9E9E9
| 569822 ||  || — || September 17, 1996 || Kitt Peak || Spacewatch ||  || align=right | 1.2 km || 
|-id=823 bgcolor=#fefefe
| 569823 ||  || — || May 26, 2015 || Haleakala || Pan-STARRS ||  || align=right | 1.1 km || 
|-id=824 bgcolor=#E9E9E9
| 569824 ||  || — || September 28, 2013 || Piszkesteto || K. Sárneczky ||  || align=right data-sort-value="0.98" | 980 m || 
|-id=825 bgcolor=#d6d6d6
| 569825 ||  || — || December 22, 2012 || Haleakala || Pan-STARRS || 7:4 || align=right | 3.5 km || 
|-id=826 bgcolor=#d6d6d6
| 569826 ||  || — || January 2, 2012 || Mount Lemmon || Mount Lemmon Survey ||  || align=right | 2.7 km || 
|-id=827 bgcolor=#E9E9E9
| 569827 ||  || — || December 2, 2005 || Kitt Peak || L. H. Wasserman, R. Millis ||  || align=right | 1.5 km || 
|-id=828 bgcolor=#fefefe
| 569828 ||  || — || October 16, 2013 || Mount Lemmon || Mount Lemmon Survey || H || align=right data-sort-value="0.66" | 660 m || 
|-id=829 bgcolor=#E9E9E9
| 569829 ||  || — || October 1, 2008 || Kitt Peak || Spacewatch ||  || align=right | 1.9 km || 
|-id=830 bgcolor=#E9E9E9
| 569830 ||  || — || January 30, 2011 || Mount Lemmon || Mount Lemmon Survey ||  || align=right data-sort-value="0.74" | 740 m || 
|-id=831 bgcolor=#E9E9E9
| 569831 ||  || — || December 3, 2005 || Mauna Kea || Mauna Kea Obs. ||  || align=right | 1.8 km || 
|-id=832 bgcolor=#d6d6d6
| 569832 ||  || — || October 13, 2010 || Bergisch Gladbach || W. Bickel ||  || align=right | 2.8 km || 
|-id=833 bgcolor=#E9E9E9
| 569833 ||  || — || August 24, 2017 || Haleakala || Pan-STARRS ||  || align=right data-sort-value="0.99" | 990 m || 
|-id=834 bgcolor=#E9E9E9
| 569834 ||  || — || November 3, 2005 || Mount Lemmon || Mount Lemmon Survey ||  || align=right data-sort-value="0.88" | 880 m || 
|-id=835 bgcolor=#E9E9E9
| 569835 ||  || — || December 4, 2005 || Mount Lemmon || Mount Lemmon Survey ||  || align=right | 1.3 km || 
|-id=836 bgcolor=#fefefe
| 569836 ||  || — || December 10, 2005 || Kitt Peak || Spacewatch ||  || align=right data-sort-value="0.59" | 590 m || 
|-id=837 bgcolor=#fefefe
| 569837 ||  || — || December 1, 2005 || Kitt Peak || Spacewatch || H || align=right data-sort-value="0.63" | 630 m || 
|-id=838 bgcolor=#d6d6d6
| 569838 ||  || — || March 4, 2013 || Haleakala || Pan-STARRS ||  || align=right | 3.1 km || 
|-id=839 bgcolor=#E9E9E9
| 569839 ||  || — || September 13, 2013 || Catalina || CSS ||  || align=right | 1.5 km || 
|-id=840 bgcolor=#E9E9E9
| 569840 ||  || — || April 12, 2016 || Haleakala || Pan-STARRS ||  || align=right data-sort-value="0.87" | 870 m || 
|-id=841 bgcolor=#d6d6d6
| 569841 ||  || — || January 16, 2018 || Haleakala || Pan-STARRS ||  || align=right | 2.0 km || 
|-id=842 bgcolor=#E9E9E9
| 569842 ||  || — || December 1, 2005 || Mount Lemmon || Mount Lemmon Survey ||  || align=right | 2.2 km || 
|-id=843 bgcolor=#E9E9E9
| 569843 ||  || — || December 5, 2005 || Kitt Peak || Spacewatch ||  || align=right | 2.3 km || 
|-id=844 bgcolor=#E9E9E9
| 569844 ||  || — || December 2, 2005 || Mauna Kea || Mauna Kea Obs. ||  || align=right | 1.5 km || 
|-id=845 bgcolor=#d6d6d6
| 569845 ||  || — || December 10, 2005 || Kitt Peak || Spacewatch ||  || align=right | 3.0 km || 
|-id=846 bgcolor=#fefefe
| 569846 ||  || — || December 5, 2005 || Kitt Peak || Spacewatch ||  || align=right data-sort-value="0.75" | 750 m || 
|-id=847 bgcolor=#E9E9E9
| 569847 ||  || — || December 22, 2005 || Catalina || CSS ||  || align=right | 3.1 km || 
|-id=848 bgcolor=#E9E9E9
| 569848 ||  || — || November 25, 2005 || Kitt Peak || Spacewatch ||  || align=right | 1.7 km || 
|-id=849 bgcolor=#E9E9E9
| 569849 ||  || — || December 21, 2005 || Kitt Peak || Spacewatch ||  || align=right | 1.8 km || 
|-id=850 bgcolor=#fefefe
| 569850 ||  || — || December 22, 2005 || Kitt Peak || Spacewatch ||  || align=right data-sort-value="0.88" | 880 m || 
|-id=851 bgcolor=#E9E9E9
| 569851 ||  || — || December 22, 2005 || Kitt Peak || Spacewatch ||  || align=right | 1.4 km || 
|-id=852 bgcolor=#E9E9E9
| 569852 ||  || — || November 28, 2005 || Kitt Peak || Spacewatch ||  || align=right | 2.8 km || 
|-id=853 bgcolor=#d6d6d6
| 569853 ||  || — || December 23, 2005 || Kitt Peak || Spacewatch ||  || align=right | 2.1 km || 
|-id=854 bgcolor=#d6d6d6
| 569854 ||  || — || December 24, 2005 || Kitt Peak || Spacewatch ||  || align=right | 2.7 km || 
|-id=855 bgcolor=#fefefe
| 569855 ||  || — || December 24, 2005 || Kitt Peak || Spacewatch ||  || align=right data-sort-value="0.57" | 570 m || 
|-id=856 bgcolor=#fefefe
| 569856 ||  || — || December 24, 2005 || Kitt Peak || Spacewatch ||  || align=right data-sort-value="0.49" | 490 m || 
|-id=857 bgcolor=#E9E9E9
| 569857 ||  || — || December 4, 2005 || Mount Lemmon || Mount Lemmon Survey ||  || align=right data-sort-value="0.79" | 790 m || 
|-id=858 bgcolor=#d6d6d6
| 569858 ||  || — || December 25, 2005 || Kitt Peak || Spacewatch ||  || align=right | 3.4 km || 
|-id=859 bgcolor=#E9E9E9
| 569859 ||  || — || December 24, 2005 || Kitt Peak || Spacewatch ||  || align=right | 1.2 km || 
|-id=860 bgcolor=#E9E9E9
| 569860 ||  || — || December 24, 2005 || Kitt Peak || Spacewatch ||  || align=right | 1.6 km || 
|-id=861 bgcolor=#E9E9E9
| 569861 ||  || — || December 22, 2005 || Kitt Peak || Spacewatch ||  || align=right | 1.8 km || 
|-id=862 bgcolor=#E9E9E9
| 569862 ||  || — || November 1, 2005 || Mount Lemmon || Mount Lemmon Survey ||  || align=right | 1.0 km || 
|-id=863 bgcolor=#fefefe
| 569863 ||  || — || December 24, 2005 || Kitt Peak || Spacewatch ||  || align=right data-sort-value="0.86" | 860 m || 
|-id=864 bgcolor=#E9E9E9
| 569864 ||  || — || December 5, 2005 || Mount Lemmon || Mount Lemmon Survey ||  || align=right | 1.5 km || 
|-id=865 bgcolor=#d6d6d6
| 569865 ||  || — || December 24, 2005 || Kitt Peak || Spacewatch ||  || align=right | 2.8 km || 
|-id=866 bgcolor=#d6d6d6
| 569866 ||  || — || December 24, 2005 || Kitt Peak || Spacewatch ||  || align=right | 2.6 km || 
|-id=867 bgcolor=#E9E9E9
| 569867 ||  || — || December 24, 2005 || Kitt Peak || Spacewatch ||  || align=right | 1.3 km || 
|-id=868 bgcolor=#fefefe
| 569868 ||  || — || December 5, 2005 || Mount Lemmon || Mount Lemmon Survey || H || align=right data-sort-value="0.71" | 710 m || 
|-id=869 bgcolor=#E9E9E9
| 569869 ||  || — || December 25, 2005 || Mount Lemmon || Mount Lemmon Survey ||  || align=right | 1.5 km || 
|-id=870 bgcolor=#E9E9E9
| 569870 ||  || — || December 27, 2005 || Kitt Peak || Spacewatch ||  || align=right data-sort-value="0.94" | 940 m || 
|-id=871 bgcolor=#E9E9E9
| 569871 ||  || — || November 29, 2005 || Mount Lemmon || Mount Lemmon Survey ||  || align=right | 1.5 km || 
|-id=872 bgcolor=#E9E9E9
| 569872 ||  || — || December 25, 2005 || Kitt Peak || Spacewatch ||  || align=right | 1.3 km || 
|-id=873 bgcolor=#E9E9E9
| 569873 ||  || — || December 25, 2005 || Kitt Peak || Spacewatch ||  || align=right | 1.1 km || 
|-id=874 bgcolor=#E9E9E9
| 569874 ||  || — || December 25, 2005 || Kitt Peak || Spacewatch ||  || align=right | 1.6 km || 
|-id=875 bgcolor=#E9E9E9
| 569875 ||  || — || December 25, 2005 || Kitt Peak || Spacewatch ||  || align=right | 2.0 km || 
|-id=876 bgcolor=#fefefe
| 569876 ||  || — || December 2, 2005 || Mount Lemmon || Mount Lemmon Survey ||  || align=right data-sort-value="0.64" | 640 m || 
|-id=877 bgcolor=#E9E9E9
| 569877 ||  || — || December 26, 2005 || Mount Lemmon || Mount Lemmon Survey ||  || align=right | 2.2 km || 
|-id=878 bgcolor=#E9E9E9
| 569878 ||  || — || December 28, 2005 || Mount Lemmon || Mount Lemmon Survey ||  || align=right | 1.3 km || 
|-id=879 bgcolor=#E9E9E9
| 569879 ||  || — || December 8, 2005 || Kitt Peak || Spacewatch ||  || align=right | 1.8 km || 
|-id=880 bgcolor=#FA8072
| 569880 ||  || — || December 26, 2005 || Kitt Peak || Spacewatch ||  || align=right | 1.2 km || 
|-id=881 bgcolor=#E9E9E9
| 569881 ||  || — || December 1, 2005 || Mount Lemmon || Mount Lemmon Survey ||  || align=right | 1.9 km || 
|-id=882 bgcolor=#E9E9E9
| 569882 ||  || — || December 24, 2005 || Kitt Peak || Spacewatch ||  || align=right | 2.4 km || 
|-id=883 bgcolor=#E9E9E9
| 569883 ||  || — || December 24, 2005 || Kitt Peak || Spacewatch ||  || align=right | 1.8 km || 
|-id=884 bgcolor=#d6d6d6
| 569884 ||  || — || November 30, 2005 || Kitt Peak || Spacewatch ||  || align=right | 2.7 km || 
|-id=885 bgcolor=#E9E9E9
| 569885 ||  || — || December 28, 2005 || Kitt Peak || Spacewatch ||  || align=right | 1.5 km || 
|-id=886 bgcolor=#E9E9E9
| 569886 ||  || — || December 28, 2005 || Mount Lemmon || Mount Lemmon Survey ||  || align=right | 1.3 km || 
|-id=887 bgcolor=#E9E9E9
| 569887 ||  || — || December 28, 2005 || Mount Lemmon || Mount Lemmon Survey ||  || align=right | 1.8 km || 
|-id=888 bgcolor=#E9E9E9
| 569888 ||  || — || December 28, 2005 || Mount Lemmon || Mount Lemmon Survey ||  || align=right data-sort-value="0.89" | 890 m || 
|-id=889 bgcolor=#E9E9E9
| 569889 ||  || — || December 28, 2005 || Mount Lemmon || Mount Lemmon Survey ||  || align=right data-sort-value="0.85" | 850 m || 
|-id=890 bgcolor=#E9E9E9
| 569890 ||  || — || December 29, 2005 || Catalina || CSS ||  || align=right | 2.2 km || 
|-id=891 bgcolor=#fefefe
| 569891 ||  || — || December 1, 2005 || Mount Lemmon || Mount Lemmon Survey ||  || align=right data-sort-value="0.98" | 980 m || 
|-id=892 bgcolor=#E9E9E9
| 569892 ||  || — || December 29, 2005 || Mount Lemmon || Mount Lemmon Survey ||  || align=right | 2.1 km || 
|-id=893 bgcolor=#E9E9E9
| 569893 ||  || — || December 29, 2005 || Socorro || LINEAR ||  || align=right data-sort-value="0.84" | 840 m || 
|-id=894 bgcolor=#E9E9E9
| 569894 ||  || — || December 25, 2005 || Kitt Peak || Spacewatch ||  || align=right | 1.3 km || 
|-id=895 bgcolor=#d6d6d6
| 569895 ||  || — || December 28, 2005 || Kitt Peak || Spacewatch ||  || align=right | 2.5 km || 
|-id=896 bgcolor=#E9E9E9
| 569896 ||  || — || November 25, 2005 || Mount Lemmon || Mount Lemmon Survey ||  || align=right | 1.9 km || 
|-id=897 bgcolor=#fefefe
| 569897 ||  || — || December 24, 2005 || Socorro || LINEAR ||  || align=right | 1.1 km || 
|-id=898 bgcolor=#fefefe
| 569898 ||  || — || December 29, 2005 || Kitt Peak || Spacewatch ||  || align=right data-sort-value="0.78" | 780 m || 
|-id=899 bgcolor=#d6d6d6
| 569899 ||  || — || December 30, 2005 || Kitt Peak || Spacewatch ||  || align=right | 3.4 km || 
|-id=900 bgcolor=#d6d6d6
| 569900 ||  || — || December 30, 2005 || Kitt Peak || Spacewatch ||  || align=right | 2.9 km || 
|}

569901–570000 

|-bgcolor=#E9E9E9
| 569901 ||  || — || December 6, 2005 || Mount Lemmon || Mount Lemmon Survey ||  || align=right | 2.2 km || 
|-id=902 bgcolor=#d6d6d6
| 569902 ||  || — || December 31, 2005 || Kitt Peak || Spacewatch ||  || align=right | 3.1 km || 
|-id=903 bgcolor=#E9E9E9
| 569903 ||  || — || December 1, 2005 || Mount Lemmon || Mount Lemmon Survey ||  || align=right | 1.5 km || 
|-id=904 bgcolor=#E9E9E9
| 569904 ||  || — || December 27, 2005 || Kitt Peak || Spacewatch ||  || align=right | 1.5 km || 
|-id=905 bgcolor=#d6d6d6
| 569905 ||  || — || December 25, 2005 || Kitt Peak || Spacewatch ||  || align=right | 3.0 km || 
|-id=906 bgcolor=#E9E9E9
| 569906 ||  || — || December 31, 2005 || Mount Lemmon || Mount Lemmon Survey ||  || align=right data-sort-value="0.98" | 980 m || 
|-id=907 bgcolor=#d6d6d6
| 569907 ||  || — || December 21, 2005 || Kitt Peak || Spacewatch ||  || align=right | 3.2 km || 
|-id=908 bgcolor=#E9E9E9
| 569908 ||  || — || December 25, 2005 || Kitt Peak || Spacewatch ||  || align=right data-sort-value="0.85" | 850 m || 
|-id=909 bgcolor=#E9E9E9
| 569909 ||  || — || February 19, 2002 || Kitt Peak || Spacewatch ||  || align=right | 1.6 km || 
|-id=910 bgcolor=#fefefe
| 569910 ||  || — || September 28, 2001 || Palomar || NEAT ||  || align=right data-sort-value="0.69" | 690 m || 
|-id=911 bgcolor=#fefefe
| 569911 ||  || — || December 26, 2005 || Kitt Peak || Spacewatch ||  || align=right data-sort-value="0.74" | 740 m || 
|-id=912 bgcolor=#E9E9E9
| 569912 ||  || — || December 27, 2005 || Kitt Peak || Spacewatch ||  || align=right data-sort-value="0.75" | 750 m || 
|-id=913 bgcolor=#d6d6d6
| 569913 ||  || — || December 28, 2005 || Mount Lemmon || Mount Lemmon Survey || 3:2 || align=right | 3.1 km || 
|-id=914 bgcolor=#E9E9E9
| 569914 ||  || — || August 21, 2004 || Siding Spring || SSS ||  || align=right | 1.2 km || 
|-id=915 bgcolor=#E9E9E9
| 569915 ||  || — || December 28, 2005 || Kitt Peak || Spacewatch ||  || align=right | 1.7 km || 
|-id=916 bgcolor=#E9E9E9
| 569916 ||  || — || December 29, 2005 || Kitt Peak || Spacewatch ||  || align=right | 1.2 km || 
|-id=917 bgcolor=#fefefe
| 569917 ||  || — || December 29, 2005 || Kitt Peak || Spacewatch ||  || align=right data-sort-value="0.75" | 750 m || 
|-id=918 bgcolor=#E9E9E9
| 569918 ||  || — || December 4, 2005 || Kitt Peak || Spacewatch ||  || align=right | 1.0 km || 
|-id=919 bgcolor=#E9E9E9
| 569919 ||  || — || December 30, 2005 || Kitt Peak || Spacewatch ||  || align=right | 1.6 km || 
|-id=920 bgcolor=#d6d6d6
| 569920 ||  || — || December 30, 2005 || Kitt Peak || Spacewatch ||  || align=right | 2.9 km || 
|-id=921 bgcolor=#E9E9E9
| 569921 ||  || — || December 30, 2005 || Kitt Peak || Spacewatch ||  || align=right | 1.3 km || 
|-id=922 bgcolor=#E9E9E9
| 569922 ||  || — || December 28, 2005 || Kitt Peak || Spacewatch ||  || align=right | 1.5 km || 
|-id=923 bgcolor=#E9E9E9
| 569923 ||  || — || December 28, 2005 || Kitt Peak || Spacewatch ||  || align=right | 1.4 km || 
|-id=924 bgcolor=#d6d6d6
| 569924 ||  || — || December 30, 2005 || Kitt Peak || Spacewatch ||  || align=right | 3.2 km || 
|-id=925 bgcolor=#E9E9E9
| 569925 ||  || — || December 30, 2005 || Kitt Peak || Spacewatch ||  || align=right | 1.4 km || 
|-id=926 bgcolor=#E9E9E9
| 569926 ||  || — || December 4, 2005 || Kitt Peak || Spacewatch ||  || align=right data-sort-value="0.99" | 990 m || 
|-id=927 bgcolor=#d6d6d6
| 569927 ||  || — || December 24, 2005 || Kitt Peak || Spacewatch ||  || align=right | 2.5 km || 
|-id=928 bgcolor=#E9E9E9
| 569928 ||  || — || December 24, 2005 || Kitt Peak || Spacewatch ||  || align=right | 1.2 km || 
|-id=929 bgcolor=#d6d6d6
| 569929 ||  || — || November 26, 2005 || Kitt Peak || Spacewatch ||  || align=right | 2.3 km || 
|-id=930 bgcolor=#E9E9E9
| 569930 ||  || — || July 30, 2003 || Palomar || NEAT ||  || align=right | 2.9 km || 
|-id=931 bgcolor=#E9E9E9
| 569931 ||  || — || December 4, 2005 || Mount Lemmon || Mount Lemmon Survey ||  || align=right | 1.8 km || 
|-id=932 bgcolor=#d6d6d6
| 569932 ||  || — || December 25, 2005 || Kitt Peak || Spacewatch ||  || align=right | 2.4 km || 
|-id=933 bgcolor=#fefefe
| 569933 ||  || — || December 27, 2005 || Kitt Peak || Spacewatch ||  || align=right data-sort-value="0.61" | 610 m || 
|-id=934 bgcolor=#E9E9E9
| 569934 ||  || — || December 24, 2005 || Kitt Peak || Spacewatch ||  || align=right | 2.2 km || 
|-id=935 bgcolor=#E9E9E9
| 569935 ||  || — || December 18, 2014 || Haleakala || Pan-STARRS ||  || align=right | 2.0 km || 
|-id=936 bgcolor=#E9E9E9
| 569936 ||  || — || December 22, 2005 || Kitt Peak || Spacewatch ||  || align=right | 1.6 km || 
|-id=937 bgcolor=#fefefe
| 569937 ||  || — || December 25, 2005 || Anderson Mesa || LONEOS || H || align=right data-sort-value="0.74" | 740 m || 
|-id=938 bgcolor=#E9E9E9
| 569938 ||  || — || November 10, 2013 || Kitt Peak || Spacewatch ||  || align=right | 1.1 km || 
|-id=939 bgcolor=#E9E9E9
| 569939 ||  || — || March 12, 2011 || Mount Lemmon || Mount Lemmon Survey ||  || align=right data-sort-value="0.91" | 910 m || 
|-id=940 bgcolor=#E9E9E9
| 569940 ||  || — || November 20, 2009 || Mount Lemmon || Mount Lemmon Survey ||  || align=right data-sort-value="0.89" | 890 m || 
|-id=941 bgcolor=#d6d6d6
| 569941 ||  || — || January 27, 2007 || Mount Lemmon || Mount Lemmon Survey ||  || align=right | 2.5 km || 
|-id=942 bgcolor=#d6d6d6
| 569942 ||  || — || September 25, 2016 || Haleakala || Pan-STARRS ||  || align=right | 2.4 km || 
|-id=943 bgcolor=#fefefe
| 569943 ||  || — || December 30, 2005 || Kitt Peak || Spacewatch ||  || align=right data-sort-value="0.64" | 640 m || 
|-id=944 bgcolor=#E9E9E9
| 569944 ||  || — || December 25, 2005 || Mount Lemmon || Mount Lemmon Survey ||  || align=right | 1.5 km || 
|-id=945 bgcolor=#d6d6d6
| 569945 ||  || — || December 31, 2005 || Kitt Peak || Spacewatch ||  || align=right | 2.6 km || 
|-id=946 bgcolor=#E9E9E9
| 569946 ||  || — || December 30, 2005 || Kitt Peak || Spacewatch ||  || align=right | 1.1 km || 
|-id=947 bgcolor=#E9E9E9
| 569947 ||  || — || December 25, 2005 || Kitt Peak || Spacewatch ||  || align=right | 1.6 km || 
|-id=948 bgcolor=#fefefe
| 569948 ||  || — || January 2, 2006 || Catalina || CSS || H || align=right data-sort-value="0.73" | 730 m || 
|-id=949 bgcolor=#fefefe
| 569949 ||  || — || January 4, 2006 || Kitt Peak || Spacewatch ||  || align=right data-sort-value="0.87" | 870 m || 
|-id=950 bgcolor=#d6d6d6
| 569950 ||  || — || December 24, 2005 || Kitt Peak || Spacewatch ||  || align=right | 2.5 km || 
|-id=951 bgcolor=#E9E9E9
| 569951 ||  || — || January 6, 2006 || Kitt Peak || Spacewatch ||  || align=right | 1.6 km || 
|-id=952 bgcolor=#d6d6d6
| 569952 ||  || — || January 7, 2006 || Mount Lemmon || Mount Lemmon Survey ||  || align=right | 2.9 km || 
|-id=953 bgcolor=#E9E9E9
| 569953 ||  || — || February 13, 2002 || Apache Point || SDSS Collaboration ||  || align=right | 1.1 km || 
|-id=954 bgcolor=#E9E9E9
| 569954 ||  || — || December 28, 2005 || Kitt Peak || Spacewatch ||  || align=right | 2.0 km || 
|-id=955 bgcolor=#fefefe
| 569955 ||  || — || December 28, 2005 || Kitt Peak || Spacewatch ||  || align=right data-sort-value="0.62" | 620 m || 
|-id=956 bgcolor=#E9E9E9
| 569956 ||  || — || January 5, 2006 || Kitt Peak || Spacewatch ||  || align=right | 1.4 km || 
|-id=957 bgcolor=#E9E9E9
| 569957 ||  || — || January 5, 2006 || Kitt Peak || Spacewatch ||  || align=right | 1.7 km || 
|-id=958 bgcolor=#E9E9E9
| 569958 ||  || — || August 23, 2004 || Kitt Peak || Spacewatch ||  || align=right | 1.5 km || 
|-id=959 bgcolor=#d6d6d6
| 569959 ||  || — || January 5, 2006 || Kitt Peak || Spacewatch ||  || align=right | 2.8 km || 
|-id=960 bgcolor=#fefefe
| 569960 ||  || — || January 5, 2006 || Kitt Peak || Spacewatch ||  || align=right | 1.0 km || 
|-id=961 bgcolor=#fefefe
| 569961 ||  || — || January 7, 2006 || Kitt Peak || Spacewatch || H || align=right data-sort-value="0.45" | 450 m || 
|-id=962 bgcolor=#E9E9E9
| 569962 ||  || — || January 8, 2006 || Kitt Peak || Spacewatch ||  || align=right | 1.7 km || 
|-id=963 bgcolor=#E9E9E9
| 569963 ||  || — || January 7, 2006 || Mount Lemmon || Mount Lemmon Survey ||  || align=right | 1.8 km || 
|-id=964 bgcolor=#E9E9E9
| 569964 ||  || — || January 7, 2006 || Kitt Peak || Spacewatch ||  || align=right | 1.2 km || 
|-id=965 bgcolor=#E9E9E9
| 569965 ||  || — || November 24, 2009 || Kitt Peak || Spacewatch ||  || align=right | 1.7 km || 
|-id=966 bgcolor=#d6d6d6
| 569966 ||  || — || March 14, 2012 || Mount Lemmon || Mount Lemmon Survey ||  || align=right | 2.8 km || 
|-id=967 bgcolor=#fefefe
| 569967 ||  || — || January 5, 2006 || Mount Lemmon || Mount Lemmon Survey ||  || align=right data-sort-value="0.60" | 600 m || 
|-id=968 bgcolor=#fefefe
| 569968 ||  || — || January 6, 2006 || Mount Lemmon || Mount Lemmon Survey || H || align=right data-sort-value="0.73" | 730 m || 
|-id=969 bgcolor=#FA8072
| 569969 ||  || — || January 9, 2006 || Siding Spring || SSS ||  || align=right data-sort-value="0.98" | 980 m || 
|-id=970 bgcolor=#E9E9E9
| 569970 ||  || — || June 14, 2012 || Haleakala || Pan-STARRS ||  || align=right | 1.2 km || 
|-id=971 bgcolor=#fefefe
| 569971 ||  || — || January 10, 2006 || Kitt Peak || Spacewatch ||  || align=right data-sort-value="0.62" | 620 m || 
|-id=972 bgcolor=#E9E9E9
| 569972 ||  || — || January 15, 2015 || Haleakala || Pan-STARRS ||  || align=right | 1.5 km || 
|-id=973 bgcolor=#fefefe
| 569973 ||  || — || January 17, 2013 || Haleakala || Pan-STARRS ||  || align=right data-sort-value="0.58" | 580 m || 
|-id=974 bgcolor=#d6d6d6
| 569974 ||  || — || January 10, 2006 || Mount Lemmon || Mount Lemmon Survey ||  || align=right | 2.7 km || 
|-id=975 bgcolor=#E9E9E9
| 569975 ||  || — || January 10, 2006 || Kitt Peak || Spacewatch ||  || align=right | 1.8 km || 
|-id=976 bgcolor=#d6d6d6
| 569976 ||  || — || January 7, 2006 || Mount Lemmon || Mount Lemmon Survey ||  || align=right | 2.1 km || 
|-id=977 bgcolor=#fefefe
| 569977 ||  || — || December 22, 2005 || Kitt Peak || Spacewatch ||  || align=right data-sort-value="0.68" | 680 m || 
|-id=978 bgcolor=#E9E9E9
| 569978 ||  || — || January 22, 2006 || Mount Lemmon || Mount Lemmon Survey ||  || align=right | 1.7 km || 
|-id=979 bgcolor=#E9E9E9
| 569979 ||  || — || January 23, 2006 || Kitt Peak || Spacewatch ||  || align=right | 1.4 km || 
|-id=980 bgcolor=#E9E9E9
| 569980 ||  || — || January 25, 2006 || Piszkesteto || K. Sárneczky ||  || align=right | 2.3 km || 
|-id=981 bgcolor=#E9E9E9
| 569981 ||  || — || December 2, 2005 || Kitt Peak || L. H. Wasserman, R. Millis ||  || align=right | 2.3 km || 
|-id=982 bgcolor=#fefefe
| 569982 ||  || — || December 25, 2005 || Kitt Peak || Spacewatch ||  || align=right data-sort-value="0.63" | 630 m || 
|-id=983 bgcolor=#E9E9E9
| 569983 ||  || — || September 17, 2004 || Kitt Peak || Spacewatch ||  || align=right | 1.5 km || 
|-id=984 bgcolor=#E9E9E9
| 569984 ||  || — || January 7, 2006 || Kitt Peak || Spacewatch ||  || align=right | 1.5 km || 
|-id=985 bgcolor=#fefefe
| 569985 ||  || — || January 22, 2006 || Mount Lemmon || Mount Lemmon Survey ||  || align=right data-sort-value="0.90" | 900 m || 
|-id=986 bgcolor=#C2FFFF
| 569986 ||  || — || January 23, 2006 || Kitt Peak || Spacewatch || L5 || align=right | 8.1 km || 
|-id=987 bgcolor=#d6d6d6
| 569987 ||  || — || January 20, 2006 || Palomar || NEAT ||  || align=right | 3.4 km || 
|-id=988 bgcolor=#fefefe
| 569988 ||  || — || January 23, 2006 || Kitt Peak || Spacewatch ||  || align=right data-sort-value="0.50" | 500 m || 
|-id=989 bgcolor=#fefefe
| 569989 ||  || — || January 23, 2006 || Kitt Peak || Spacewatch ||  || align=right data-sort-value="0.64" | 640 m || 
|-id=990 bgcolor=#E9E9E9
| 569990 ||  || — || January 23, 2006 || Kitt Peak || Spacewatch ||  || align=right | 2.2 km || 
|-id=991 bgcolor=#fefefe
| 569991 ||  || — || January 23, 2006 || Kitt Peak || Spacewatch ||  || align=right data-sort-value="0.63" | 630 m || 
|-id=992 bgcolor=#E9E9E9
| 569992 ||  || — || January 25, 2006 || Mount Lemmon || Mount Lemmon Survey ||  || align=right | 2.0 km || 
|-id=993 bgcolor=#E9E9E9
| 569993 ||  || — || January 25, 2006 || Kitt Peak || Spacewatch ||  || align=right | 1.3 km || 
|-id=994 bgcolor=#fefefe
| 569994 ||  || — || January 25, 2006 || Kitt Peak || Spacewatch ||  || align=right data-sort-value="0.62" | 620 m || 
|-id=995 bgcolor=#fefefe
| 569995 ||  || — || January 25, 2006 || Kitt Peak || Spacewatch ||  || align=right data-sort-value="0.59" | 590 m || 
|-id=996 bgcolor=#fefefe
| 569996 ||  || — || January 26, 2006 || Catalina || CSS || H || align=right data-sort-value="0.79" | 790 m || 
|-id=997 bgcolor=#E9E9E9
| 569997 ||  || — || November 30, 2005 || Mount Lemmon || Mount Lemmon Survey ||  || align=right | 1.9 km || 
|-id=998 bgcolor=#d6d6d6
| 569998 ||  || — || January 27, 2006 || 7300 || W. K. Y. Yeung || THB || align=right | 2.7 km || 
|-id=999 bgcolor=#E9E9E9
| 569999 ||  || — || January 25, 2006 || Kitt Peak || Spacewatch ||  || align=right | 2.1 km || 
|-id=000 bgcolor=#E9E9E9
| 570000 ||  || — || November 7, 2005 || Mauna Kea || Mauna Kea Obs. ||  || align=right | 1.8 km || 
|}

References

External links 
 Discovery Circumstances: Numbered Minor Planets (565001)–(570000) (IAU Minor Planet Center)

0569